= Xylosyltransferase =

Class of enzymes

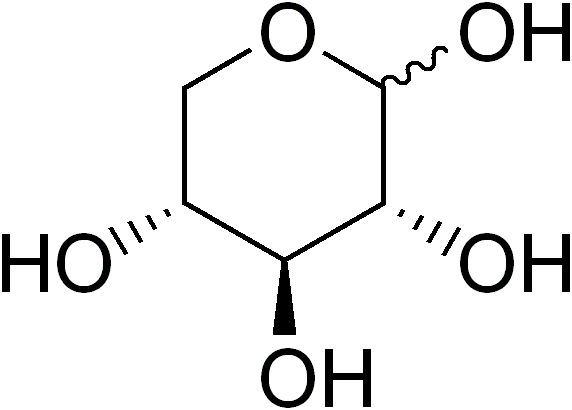
Xylose

Xylosyltransferase are transferase enzymes which act upon xylose and are classified under EC 2.4.2.

More specifically, they can refer to:

- Dolichyl-phosphate D-xylosyltransferase
- Dolichyl-xylosyl-phosphate-protein xylosyltransferase
- Flavonol-3-O-glycoside xylosyltransferase
- Glycoprotein 2-beta-D-xylosyltransferase
- Protein xylosyltransferase
- Xyloglucan 6-xylosyltransferase
- XYLT1
- XYLT2
- Zeatin O-beta-D-xylosyltransferase
