= 3'-phosphoadenylyl-sulfate:(heparan sulfate)-glucosamine 3-sulfotransferase =

3'-phosphoadenylyl-sulfate:(heparan sulfate)-glucosamine 3-sulfotransferase may refer to the following:

- (heparan sulfate)-glucosamine 3-sulfotransferase 1, an enzyme
- (heparan sulfate)-glucosamine 3-sulfotransferase 2, an enzyme
- (heparan sulfate)-glucosamine 3-sulfotransferase 3, an enzyme
