= B4GALT7 =

Protein-coding gene in humans

Identifiers
- Aliases: B4GALT7, EDSP1, XGALT1, XGPT1, EDSSLA, beta-1,4-galactosyltransferase 7, EDSSPD1, XGPT
- External IDs: OMIM: 604327; MGI: 2384987; GeneCards: B4GALT7
Available structures
| PDB | Ortholog search: PDBe RCSB |
| PDB | List of PDB id codes 4IRP, 4IRQ |
Enzyme activity
| EC # | BRENDA | ExPASy | KEGG | MetaCyc |
|---|---|---|---|---|
| 2.4.1.133 | ↗ | ↗ | ↗ | ↗ |

Gene location (Human)
| Chr. | Chromosome 5 (human) |
| Band | 5q35.3 | Start | 177,600,132 bp |
| Band | 5q35.3 | End | 177,610,330 bp |

Gene location (Mouse)
| Chr. | Chromosome 13 (mouse) |
| Band | 13|13 B1 | Start | 55,747,709 bp |
| Band | 13|13 B1 | End | 55,758,256 bp |
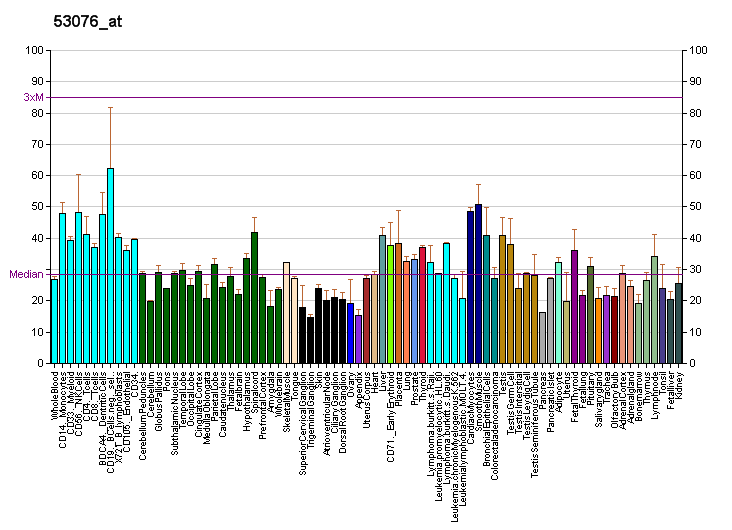

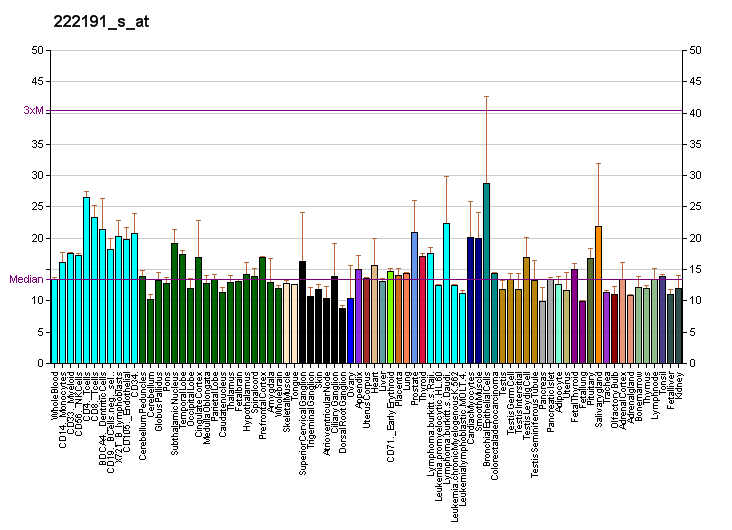
RNA expression pattern
| Bgee | Human / Mouse (ortholog); Top expressed in: tendon of biceps brachii; right adrenal gland; left adrenal gland; left adrenal cortex; right adrenal cortex; anterior pituitary; apex of heart; body of pancreas; stromal cell of endometrium; body of stomach / Top expressed in: saccule; otic vesicle; otic placode; cumulus cell; renal corpuscle; medullary collecting duct; decidua; granulocyte; blood; internal carotid artery; More reference expression data |
| BioGPS | More reference expression data |
Gene ontology
| Molecular function | transferase activity; manganese ion binding; glycosyltransferase activity; metal ion binding; galactosyltransferase activity; protein binding; beta-N-acetylglucosaminylglycopeptide beta-1,4-galactosyltransferase activity; xylosylprotein 4-beta-galactosyltransferase activity |
| Cellular component | integral component of membrane; Golgi apparatus; membrane; Golgi membrane; Golgi cisterna membrane |
| Biological process | glycosaminoglycan metabolic process; protein glycosylation; proteoglycan metabolic process; glycosaminoglycan biosynthetic process; protein N-linked glycosylation; negative regulation of fibroblast proliferation; supramolecular fiber organization; carbohydrate metabolic process |
Sources:Amigo / QuickGO
Orthologs
| Databases | NCBI: entry; OMA: entry |
| Species | Human | Mouse |
| Entrez | 11285 | 218271 |
| Ensembl | ENSG00000027847 | ENSMUSG00000021504 |
| UniProt | Q9UBV7 | Q8R087 |
| RefSeq (mRNA) | NM_007255 | NM_146045; NM_001311137 |
| RefSeq (protein) | NP_009186 | NP_001298066; NP_666157 |
| Location (UCSC) | Chr 5: 177.6 – 177.61 Mb | Chr 13: 55.75 – 55.76 Mb |
| PubMed search |
- Wikidata
| View/Edit Human | View/Edit Mouse |

Beta-1,4-galactosyltransferase 7 also known as galactosyltransferase I is an enzyme that in humans is encoded by the B4GALT7 gene. Galactosyltransferase I catalyzes the synthesis of the glycosaminoglycan-protein linkage in proteoglycans. Proteoglycans in turn are structural components of the extracellular matrix that is found between cells in connective tissues.

== Function ==
Galactosyltransferase I is one of seven β-1,4-galactosyltransferase (β4GalT) enzymes. These enzymes are type II membrane-bound glycoproteins that appear to have exclusive specificity for the donor substrate UDP-galactose; all transfer galactose in a β-1,4 linkage to similar acceptor sugars: GlcNAc, Glc, and Xyl. Each beta4GalT has a distinct function in the biosynthesis of different glycoconjugates and saccharide structures. As type II membrane proteins, they have an N-terminal hydrophobic signal sequence that directs the protein to the Golgi apparatus and which then remains uncleaved to function as a transmembrane anchor. By sequence similarity, the beta4GalTs form four groups: β4GalT1 and β4GalT2, β4GalT3 and β4GalT4, β4GalT5 and β4GalT6, and β4GalT7. The enzyme encoded by this gene attaches the first galactose in the common carbohydrate-protein (GlcA-β-1,3-Gal-β-1,3-Gal-β-1,4-Xyl-beta1-O-Ser) linkage found in proteoglycans. Manganese is required as a cofactor. This enzyme differs from the other six beta4GalTs because it lacks the conserved β4GalT1-β4GalT6 Cys residues and it is located in cis-Golgi instead of trans-Golgi.

== Clinical significance ==
Mutations in the B4GALT7 gene that result in a defective galactosyltransferase I enzyme with reduced or absent activity are associated with Spondylodysplastic, formerly progeroid type Ehlers–Danlos syndrome. The reduced activity of B4GALT7 is associated with a reduced substitution of the proteoglycans decorin and biglycan with glycosaminoglycan carbohydrate chains, and with alterations in heparan sulfate biosynthesis, resulting in delayed wound repair, altered migration, adhesion and contractility of patient fibroblasts. Since mutations in B4GALT7 impair a glycosylation pathway, the resulting subtype of Ehlers–Danlos syndrome may be considered a congenital disorder of glycosylation (CDG), according to the new CDG nomenclature.

Mutations in B4GALT7 cause Larsen syndrome.
