= Protein xylosyltransferase =

Class of enzymes

protein xylosyltransferase

Identifiers
- EC no.: 2.4.2.26
- CAS no.: 55576-38-0

Databases
- IntEnz: IntEnz view
- BRENDA: BRENDA entry
- ExPASy: NiceZyme view
- KEGG: KEGG entry
- MetaCyc: metabolic pathway
- PRIAM: profile
- PDB structures: RCSB PDB PDBe PDBsum
- Gene Ontology: AmiGO / QuickGO
Search
- PMC: articles
- PubMed: articles
- NCBI: proteins

In enzymology, a protein xylosyltransferase (EC 2.4.2.26) is an enzyme that catalyzes the chemical reaction in which a beta-D-xylosyl residue is transferred from UDP-D-xylose to the sidechain oxygen atom of a serine residue in a protein.

This enzyme belongs to the family of glycosyltransferases, specifically the pentosyltransferases. The systematic name of this enzyme class is UDP-D-xylose:protein beta-D-xylosyltransferase. Other names in common use include UDP-D-xylose:core protein beta-D-xylosyltransferase, UDP-D-xylose:core protein xylosyltransferase, UDP-D-xylose:proteoglycan core protein beta-D-xylosyltransferase, UDP-xylose-core protein beta-D-xylosyltransferase, uridine diphosphoxylose-core protein beta-xylosyltransferase, and uridine diphosphoxylose-protein xylosyltransferase. This enzyme participates in the biosynthesis of chondroitin sulfate and glycan structures.

== Human proteins ==
- XYLT1
- XYLT2

== See also ==
- Xylosyltransferase
