= Diabetes in Japan =

Health issue in Japan

In Japan, there are an estimated 11 million people with diabetes in 2021. Like much of the developed world, cases of diabetes in Japan have increased in recent times from an estimated 6.9 million people affected in 1997, to around 8.9 million in 2007, to over 11 million today.

== Genes and environment ==
Susceptibility of diabetes in Southeast Asia is influenced by mutations next to or within genes. Most of these genes have complex traits that interact and control multiple systems in the body. The genes are important, but they alone do not influence diabetes in this population. Westernization and globalization in Asia have led to changes in food supply and dietary patterns, coupled with risk alleles in genes of interest. Foods with high glycemic index, such as rice, have contributed to an increased risk of type 2 diabetes. These high glycemic foods, coupled with loss of gene function, have led to increase in blood glucose levels in Japanese populations. Researchers have used Genome Wide Association Studies (GWAS) to identify several genetic variants of genes that are found in white and Asian populations; however, they found that there are interethnic differences in risk allele frequency of these genes and the location of those mutations.

== Epidemiology ==
Age and gender are critical variables to track diabetes within a population over time. Another very important factor of diabetes development is the environment in which that population lives. Factors like smoking or alcohol consumption has been seen to be prevalent in Japanese populations. For example, smoking was very prominent in Japan in the 1980s where 40% of the population smoked. As of 2020, smoking has declined to around 16% of the population. The more resounding knowledge on the effect of smoking and the link to disease susceptibility has most likely driven this decline. Smoking generally leads to problems because it leads to insulin resistance and/or decrease insulin secretion.

== Genes involved ==
Many diabetic studies have tried to deduce as to what and how many genes are involved in susceptibility to disease in Japanese populations. Researchers use tools such as GWAS and quantitative trait loci (QTLs), which can be very helpful in determining what mutations are associated with disease in a population. Most of these mutations are called single nucleotide polymorphisms (SNPs) leading to different variants of a gene, and these mutations can be different or the same across varying populations. If they are the same mutations, a population could have varied allelic frequencies of the gene or genes that lead to that disease. For example, a genetic variation of TCF7L2 in Japanese population influences one's susceptibility to diabetes; however, the at-risk allele frequency in Japanese population accounted for 4% of the population compared to 21% in European and European-origin population.

Additional candidate genes with specific risk alleles have also been identified via GWAS that were persistent in European populations; however, there are considerable differences in allelic frequencies between these populations. Genes such as CDKAL1, IGF2BP2, CDKN2A/CDKN2B, HHEX, SLC30A8, and KCNJ11 have shown risk alleles persistent to white populations; however, risk allele frequency has differed. For example, the HHEX locus had an SNP denoted as rs1111875 that was found in 28.4% of the Japanese population compared to 56.1% in white populations. Akyrin1 (ANK1) has also been identified as a novel gene for type 2 diabetes in Japanese populations. SNP rs515071 located at an intron of this gene has been associated with European GWAS results. Variants of ANK1 such as rs4737009 and rs6474359 were shown to influence HbA1c levels in European populations in non-diabetic adults. To see if these SNPs were associated with rs515071 in Japanese populations, a linkage disequilibrium (LD) calculation was performed. Linkage was determined be weak, which indicates that rs515071 operates independently of other SNPs that influence HbA1c levels in other populations. So, HbA1c levels in Japanese populations seem to not be affected by these other SNPs that influence HbA1c levels in European populations. This suggests that there's no association or interaction with these three SNPs in the Japanese population. Thus, the mechanism by which this SNP rs515071 contributes to susceptibility of diabetes remains to be discovered.

Other susceptibility genes common across different ethnicities have been found. Further GWAS studies of Japanese populations have identified seven novel loci CCDC85A, FAM60A, DMRTA1, ASB3, ATP8B2, MIR4686, INAFM2. Among these loci, SNPs near or within genes such as FAM60A, DMRTA1, MIR4686, and INFAM2 showed common susceptibility loci for type 2 diabetes in different ethnicities. Monoallelic gene expression (MAE) has also been identified in a couple of genes of interest in Japanese populations. These genes are ADCY5, HNF1A, PRC1 that exhibited this monoallelic effect in Japanese populations and showed susceptibility to type 2 diabetes. As of 2020, a new repertoire of genes has been reported to be a contributor to type 2 diabetes in Japanese populations. These genes are MEF2C, TMEM161B, CEP120, PRDM6, STEAP1, ZNF804B, ZNRF3, PRIM1, IRF2BPL, LRRC74A respectively. Linkage has been reported in these genes such as ME2FC/TMEM161B and the IRF2BPL/LRRC74A; however, the underlying causes or mechanisms that leads to diabetes do to this linkage is unknown at this time.

== Susceptibility genes in action ==
A complication of diabetes is retinopathy where the eye's blood vessels are dilated and damaged due to an increase in blood pressure. A recent study has specifically looked at susceptibility to diabetic retinopathy (DR) in Japanese patients with type 2 diabetes. Using GWAS, they were able to identify an SNP locus showing genome-wide significant association DR. This was the SNP rs12630354 near STT3B. The authors also found lead SNPs of three loci that contributed to DR susceptibility in Japanese populations, which were HS6ST3A1/B1, KIAA0825, and NOX4. However, the linkage disequilibrium is low to moderate suggesting that linkage is not important and that the genes are not associated with one another. Silico chromatin interaction and eQTL analyses showed that rs12630354 upregulates STT3B expression. This SNP causes significant STT3B expression in the adrenal gland. STT3B has been suggested to participate in local synthesis and quality control of membrane involved in cholesterol and steroid metabolism in adrenocortical cells. Therefore, rs12630354 might dysregulate cholesterol and steroidal synthesis leading to increase susceptibility to DR.
