= Spondylo-ocular syndrome =

- Other names: SOS
- Spondylo-ocular syndrome is inherited in an autosomal recessive manner.
- Specialty: Medical genetics

Spondylo-ocular syndrome is a rare genetic disorder characterised by lesions in the eye and the spine.

== Presentation ==
These can be divided into those affecting the eyes, spine and other areas:

- Eyes
  - amblyopia
  - cataracts
  - nystagmus
  - retinal detachment
- Spine
  - normal height with disproportionate short trunk
  - immobile spine
  - thoracic kyphosis
  - reduced lumbar lordosis
  - pathological fractures of the vertebral bodies
- Other features
  - facial dysmorphism
  - facial hypotonia
  - low posterior hairline
  - short webbed neck
  - low set ears
  - mitral valve prolapse
  - aortic valve malformation
  - dilated ureters
  - sensineural deafness

== Genetics ==
This syndrome is caused by inactivating mutations in the xylosyltransferase (XYLT2) gene. It is inherited in an autosomal recessive manner.

== History ==
This syndrome was first described by Schmidt et al in consangineous Iraqi family in 2001.
