= Glucosaminyl 3-O-sulfotransferase =

Glucosaminyl 3-O-sulfotransferase may refer to:

- (heparan sulfate)-glucosamine 3-sulfotransferase 1, an enzyme
- (heparan sulfate)-glucosamine 3-sulfotransferase 2, an enzyme
- (heparan sulfate)-glucosamine 3-sulfotransferase 3, an enzyme
