= XYLT2 =

Protein-coding gene in the species Homo sapiens

Identifiers
- Aliases: XYLT2, PXT-II, XT2, xylT-II, SOS, xylosyltransferase 2
- External IDs: OMIM: 608125; MGI: 2444797; GeneCards: XYLT2
Enzyme activity
EC #	BRENDA	ExPASy	KEGG	MetaCyc
2.4.2.26	↗	↗	↗	↗

Gene location (Human)
Chr.	Chromosome 17 (human)
Band	17q21.33	Start	50,346,126 bp
Band	17q21.33	End	50,363,138 bp

Gene location (Mouse)
Chr.	Chromosome 11 (mouse)
Band	11|11 D	Start	94,554,677 bp
Band	11|11 D	End	94,568,341 bp
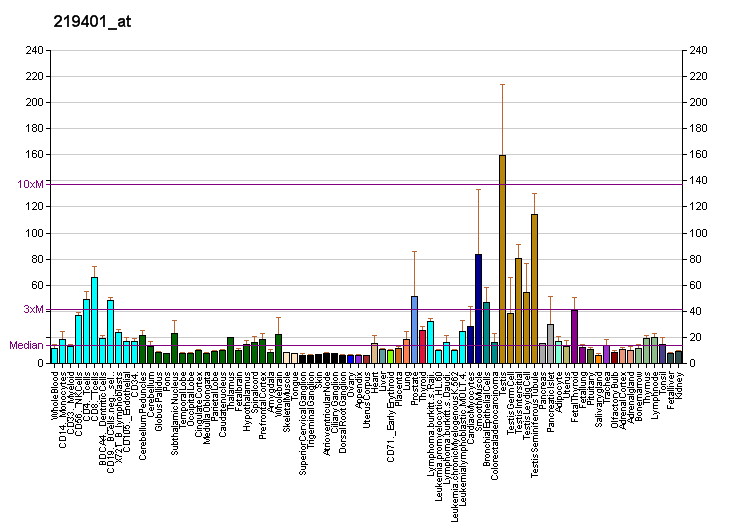
RNA expression pattern
Bgee	Human / Mouse (ortholog); Top expressed in: body of stomach; fundus; stromal cell of endometrium; left testis; apex of heart; right testis; right uterine tube; right ovary; granulocyte; prostate / Top expressed in: right kidney; lip; tail of embryo; primary visual cortex; neural layer of retina; ventricular zone; superior frontal gyrus; dentate gyrus of hippocampal formation granule cell; stroma of bone marrow; genital tubercle; More reference expression data
BioGPS	More reference expression data
Gene ontology
Molecular function	transferase activity; acetylglucosaminyltransferase activity; glycosyltransferase activity; protein xylosyltransferase activity; magnesium ion binding; manganese ion binding; metal ion binding
Cellular component	integral component of membrane; Golgi apparatus; endoplasmic reticulum membrane; endoplasmic reticulum; membrane; Golgi membrane; cellular component; extracellular space; extracellular region
Biological process	chondroitin sulfate biosynthetic process; chondroitin sulfate proteoglycan biosynthetic process; heparan sulfate proteoglycan biosynthetic process; heparin biosynthetic process; glycosaminoglycan biosynthetic process; proteoglycan biosynthetic process; glycosaminoglycan metabolic process
Sources:Amigo / QuickGO
Orthologs
Databases	NCBI: entry; OMA: entry
Species	Human	Mouse
Entrez	64132	217119
Ensembl	ENSG00000015532	ENSMUSG00000020868
UniProt	Q9H1B5	Q9EPL0
RefSeq (mRNA)	NM_022167	NM_145828
RefSeq (protein)	NP_071450	NP_665827
Location (UCSC)	Chr 17: 50.35 – 50.36 Mb	Chr 11: 94.55 – 94.57 Mb
PubMed search
- Wikidata
View/Edit Human	View/Edit Mouse

Xylosyltransferase 2 is an enzyme that in humans is encoded by the XYLT2 gene.

== Function ==
The protein encoded by this gene is an isoform of xylosyltransferase, which belongs to a family of glycosyltransferases. This enzyme transfers xylose from UDP-xylose to specific serine residues of the core protein and initiates the biosynthesis of glycosaminoglycan chains in proteoglycans including chondroitin sulfate, heparan sulfate, heparin and dermatan sulfate.

== Clinical significance ==
The enzyme activity, which is increased in scleroderma patients, is a diagnostic marker for the determination of sclerotic activity in systemic sclerosis.

Mutations in this gene have been shown to be the cause of the spondylo-ocular syndrome. It has also been implicated as cofactor in pseudoxanthoma elasticum.
