= TGFBR3 =

Protein found in humans

Identifiers
- Aliases: TGFBR3, BGCAN, betaglycan, transforming growth factor beta receptor 3
- External IDs: OMIM: 600742; MGI: 104637; GeneCards: TGFBR3

Gene location (Human)
Chr.	Chromosome 1 (human)
Band	1p22.1	Start	91,680,343 bp
Band	1p22.1	End	91,906,335 bp

Gene location (Mouse)
Chr.	Chromosome 5 (mouse)
Band	5|5 E5	Start	107,254,436 bp
Band	5|5 E5	End	107,437,495 bp
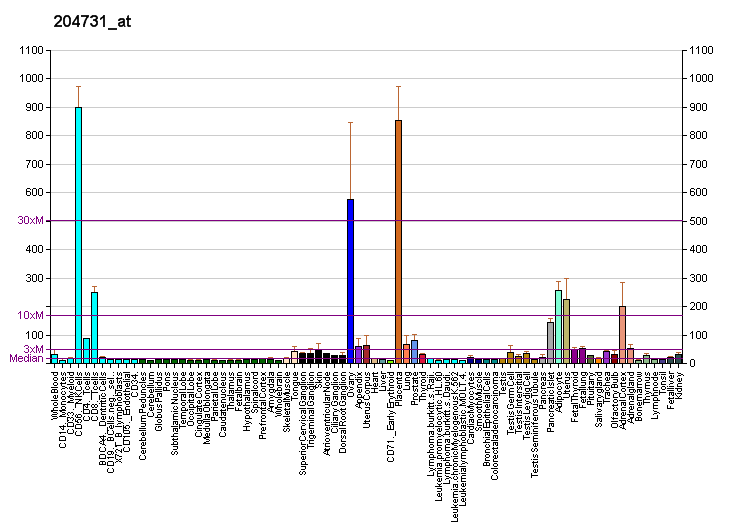
RNA expression pattern
Bgee	Human / Mouse (ortholog); Top expressed in: glomerulus; metanephric glomerulus; synovial joint; Achilles tendon; lactiferous duct; tibia; seminal vesicula; tendon of biceps brachii; nipple; urethra / Top expressed in: ciliary body; vestibular membrane of cochlear duct; Epithelium of choroid plexus; iris; stroma of bone marrow; gastrula; conjunctival fornix; retinal pigment epithelium; carotid body; decidua; More reference expression data
BioGPS	More reference expression data
Gene ontology
Molecular function	transforming growth factor beta receptor binding; heparin binding; activin binding; transforming growth factor beta receptor activity, type III; transforming growth factor beta-activated receptor activity; SMAD binding; PDZ domain binding; coreceptor activity; fibroblast growth factor binding; type II transforming growth factor beta receptor binding; protein binding; glycosaminoglycan binding; transforming growth factor beta binding
Cellular component	extracellular exosome; extracellular region; cytoplasm; integral component of membrane; inhibin-betaglycan-ActRII complex; integral component of plasma membrane; membrane; cell surface; receptor complex; plasma membrane; external side of plasma membrane; extracellular space; extracellular matrix
Biological process	response to hypoxia; heart trabecula formation; intracellular signal transduction; liver development; animal organ regeneration; definitive erythrocyte differentiation; BMP signaling pathway; positive regulation of transforming growth factor beta receptor signaling pathway; regulation of protein binding; heart morphogenesis; transforming growth factor beta receptor complex assembly; cardiac epithelial to mesenchymal transition; pathway-restricted SMAD protein phosphorylation; response to follicle-stimulating hormone; ventricular cardiac muscle tissue morphogenesis; roof of mouth development; cardiac muscle cell proliferation; response to prostaglandin E; negative regulation of transforming growth factor beta receptor signaling pathway; negative regulation of epithelial cell proliferation; cell migration; definitive hemopoiesis; epithelial to mesenchymal transition; response to luteinizing hormone; immune response; transforming growth factor beta receptor signaling pathway; epicardium-derived cardiac fibroblast cell development; ventricular septum morphogenesis; regulation of ERK1 and ERK2 cascade; ventricular compact myocardium morphogenesis; heart trabecula morphogenesis; positive regulation of cardiac muscle cell proliferation; regulation of JNK cascade; muscular septum morphogenesis; vasculogenesis involved in coronary vascular morphogenesis; outflow tract morphogenesis; secondary palate development; protein-containing complex assembly
Sources:Amigo / QuickGO
Orthologs
Databases	NCBI: entry; OMA: entry
Species	Human	Mouse
Entrez	7049	21814
Ensembl	ENSG00000069702	ENSMUSG00000029287
UniProt	Q03167	O88393
RefSeq (mRNA)	NM_001195683; NM_001195684; NM_003243	NM_011578
RefSeq (protein)	NP_001182612; NP_001182613; NP_003234	NP_035708
Location (UCSC)	Chr 1: 91.68 – 91.91 Mb	Chr 5: 107.25 – 107.44 Mb
PubMed search
- Wikidata
View/Edit Human	View/Edit Mouse

Betaglycan, also known as Transforming growth factor beta receptor III (TGFBR3), is a cell-surface chondroitin sulfate / heparan sulfate proteoglycan >300 kDa in molecular weight. Betaglycan binds to various members of the TGF-beta superfamily of ligands via its core protein, and bFGF via its heparan sulfate chains. TGFBR3 is the most widely expressed type of TGF-beta receptor. Its affinity towards all individual isoforms of TGF-beta is similarly high and therefore it plays an important role as a coreceptor mediating the binding of TGF-beta to its other receptors – specifically TGFBR2. The intrinsic kinase activity of this receptor has not yet been described. In regard of TGF-beta signalling it is generally considered a non-signaling receptor or a coreceptor. By binding to various member of the TGF-beta superfamily at the cell surface it acts as a reservoir of TGF-beta.

Study of a mouse knock-out for the Tgfbr3 gene showed a fundamental effect on the correct development of organs and the overall viability of the animals used. Within the same study, no significant changes in Smad signalling (typical for TGF-beta cascade) were detected. This fact suggests that additional, as yet undescribed functions of betaglycan may be mediated by non-classical signalling pathways.

== Domains and function ==
TGFBR3 is composed of an extracellular receptor domain consisting of 849 amino acids which is intracellularly connected to a short cytoplasmic domain. Betaglycan, being expressed by a whole range of various cell types within the organism, can be found in the form of a membrane-bound receptor, or as a soluble protein capable of interactions with the extracellular matrix (ECM).

The formation of soluble betaglycan is mediated by metalloproteinases and other enzymes present in the ECM. Proteolytic cleavage releases an ectodomain containing two binding sites for TGF-beta. Due to high affinity to its ligand, free betaglycan is an important factor in the deposition and neutralization of this cytokine within the ECM. The ratio of membrane and soluble variant in the organism significantly affects the availability of TGF-beta and subsequent intracellular signalling.

The cytoplasmic domain mediates interactions with scaffold proteins inside the cell. These intracellular interactions do not affect the functionality of the ectodomain – nor its affinity to TGF-beta. However, they affect cell migration and the overall responsiveness of a given cell to the action of TGF-beta.

Re-release of the cytokine can occur due to the proteolytic activity of the pro-apoptotic serine protease – granzyme B. Plasmin – a serine protease present in the blood, activated as part of inflammatory reactions, then participates in the definitive degradation of betaglycan.

== See also ==
- TGF beta receptors
