= Xylogalacturonan beta-1,3-xylosyltransferase =

Class of enzymes

Identifiers
- EC no.: 2.4.2.41

Databases
- IntEnz: IntEnz view
- BRENDA: BRENDA entry
- ExPASy: NiceZyme view
- KEGG: KEGG entry
- MetaCyc: metabolic pathway
- PRIAM: profile
- PDB structures: RCSB PDB PDBe PDBsum
Search
- PMC: articles
- PubMed: articles
- NCBI: proteins

Xylogalacturonan beta-1,3-xylosyltransferase (EC 2.4.2.41, xylogalacturonan xylosyltransferase, XGA xylosyltransferase) is an enzyme with systematic name UDP-D-xylose:xylogalacturonan 3-beta-D-xylosyltransferase. This enzyme catalyses the following chemical reaction

Transfers a xylosyl residue from UDP-D-xylose to a D-galactose residue in xylogalacturonan, forming a beta-1,3-D-xylosyl-D-galactose linkage.

This enzyme is involved in plant cell wall synthesis.
