= Fractone =

Extracellular matrix structure

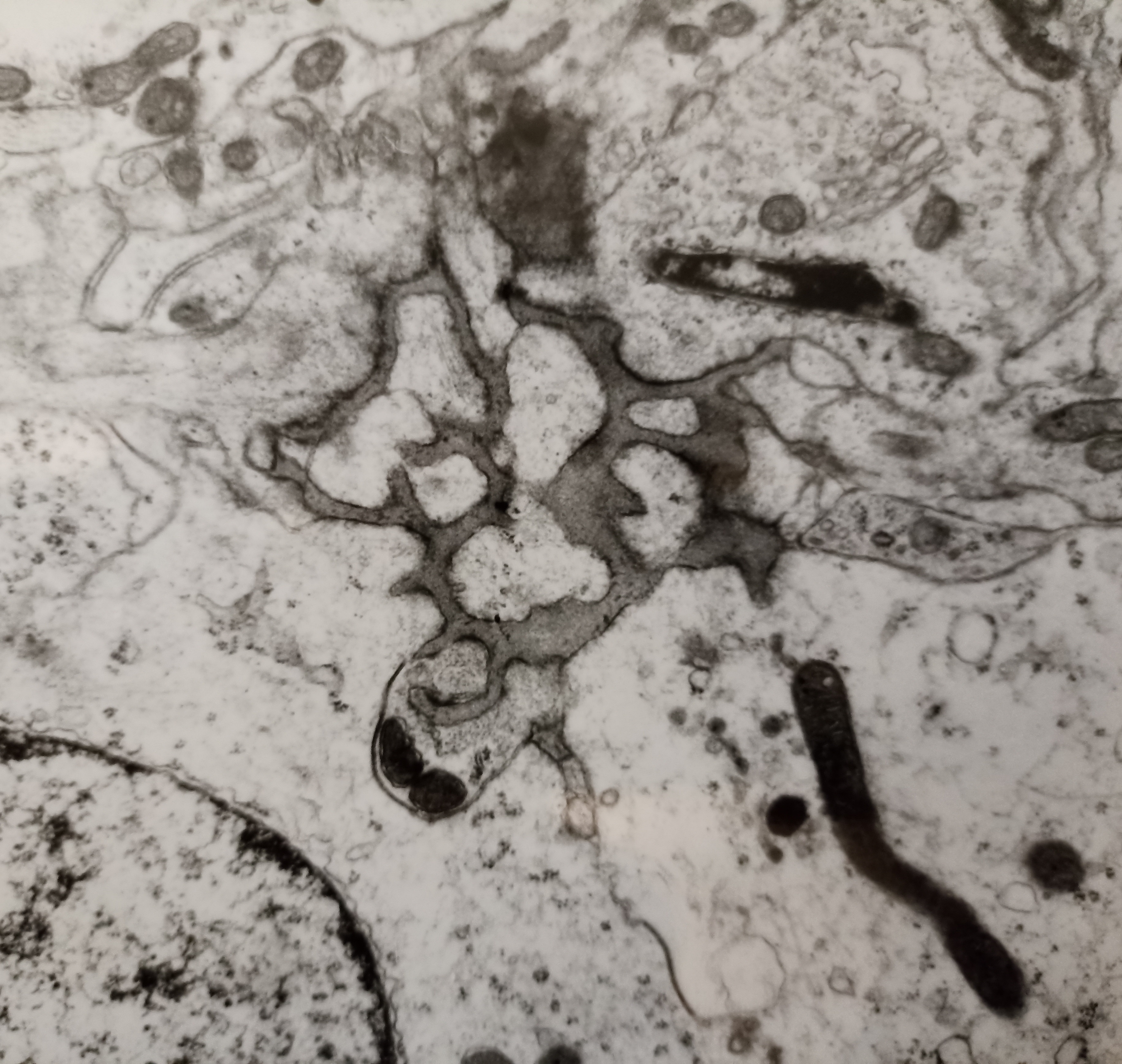
- Transmission electron micrograph of a fractone displaying typical fractal ultrastructural characteristics

Details

Identifiers
- Latin: none

In biology, fractones are structures consisting primarily of laminin and heparan sulfate proteoglycan (HSPG) first discovered in the extracellular matrix niche of the subventricular zone of the lateral ventricle (SVZa) in the mouse brain. Recent research has suggested its importance in adult neurogenesis, gliogenesis, and angiogenesis.

Fractones are found near or connected to stem cells, and are highly implicated in cell proliferation, differentiation and migration.

New work suggests that fractones are implicated in corticalization during embryogenesis, as well as in cancer and neurodegenerative disease.

== History ==
The term fractone is derived from fractal, a term coined by Benoît Mandelbrot in 1975.

Fractones were discovered in 2002 in the extracellular matrix niche of the subventricular zone of the lateral ventricule (SVZa) in a mouse brain. Originally found in the neurogenic areas of the brain, recent studies indicate that fractones are also present in multiple organisms, including but not limited to plants, fungi, invertebrates, and vertebrate animals. As the discovery of fractones marked a turning point in neurosciences and the understanding of stem cell niches in the mammal brain, other projects have been conducted in different organs and Fractones were found to be highly implicated not only in physiology but also in numerous pathologies. For instance, fractones are extremely reduced in autism but highly represented in inflammation, cancer and other pathologies.

== Properties ==
Fractones are structures composed of proteoglycans, consisting primarily but not limited to laminin and HSPG. Different patterns of sulfation in HSPG and chain length are responsible for numerous pathways in physiology as well as in pathology, being involved in most growth factor bindings, and in embryo development, viral infection, cancer, and other pathologies.

The HSPG part of fractones is responsible for growth factor binding, retention and release in the extracellular matrix. Moreover, fractones are always linked to cell processes, thus connecting up to 20 different cells to a single fractone, acting as a control panel for all of them.

== Physiology ==
Fractones are extracellular matrix structures first discovered in the neurogenic zone of the brain. Fractones primarily consist of proteoglycans such as laminin and HSPG. These proteoglycans bind growth factor in the extracellular matrix to regulate stem cell proliferation, which has been demonstrated in the adult brain neurogenic zone, where fractones are responsible for the production and differenciation of new neurons. The main role of these structures, linked to a wide array of cells, is to act as a control panel for cell proliferation, differentiation and migration. Fractones also regulate stem cell fate in the brain, controlling how a stem cell should evolve.

== Embryonic development ==
Fractones have been described in the early development of the mouse embryo as punctates of laminin and/or HSPG. They adopt different patterns at each stage of the development, from the 2-cell stage to post-natal stages. Recent studies laso show that fractones play a key role in corticalization and the establishment of the subventricular zone and the ventricular zone of the lateral ventricule

== Cancer ==
Recent work suggests that fractones are omnipresent in cancer. As fractones are believed to be either pre- or post-basement membrane structures, analysis of fractone-markers in patients with glioblastoma, intestine and stomach carcinoma, kidney, liver, lung and ovary tumors revealed numerous fractones while basement membranes were usually absent. This may indicates changes in the tumor microenvironment that may rewire cancerous cells and promote growth and proliferation.

== Alzheimer's disease ==
Fractones might have also already been described in Alzheimer's disease (AD) as they are depicted as laminin and/or HSPG punctates. Amyloid plaque-associated punctates of laminin and heparan sulfate proteoglycan have already been described in several sources, but not yet associated with fractone research.
