= Testican =

Testicans are a type of proteoglycan.

In humans there are three testicans, also referred to as SPOCK proteins:

- SPOCK1 (Testican 1)
- SPOCK2 (Testican 2)
- SPOCK3 (Testican 3)

Testican-1 is a highly conserved, multidomain proteoglycan that is most prominently expressed in the thalamus, and is upregulated in activated astroglial cells of the cerebrum. Several functions of this gene product have now been demonstrated in vitro including membrane-type matrix metalloproteinase inhibition, cathepsin L inhibition, and low-affinity calcium binding. The purified gene product has been shown to inhibit cell attachment and neurite extensions in culture. Functions of testican in vivo have yet to be demonstrated in knockout mice or other models. Testican has been shown to carry substantial amounts of chondroitin sulfate as well as other oligosaccharides, but the biological significance of these embellishments is not yet known.

Testican-1 plays a role in lapatinib resistance, which is a drug used to treat HER2-positive gastric cancer. When testican-1 levels are artificially reduced, sensitivity towards lapatinib was once again increased. This shows the potential for future use in combating drug resistance.

== Testican and the Extracellular Matrix ==
In addition to testican-1's association with lapatinib resistance, testican has been shown to regulate proteases, such as MMPs (matrix metalloproteinases), thereby regulating ECM degradation. The first isoform of testican, Testican-1, and the third, Testican-3, inhibit the activation of pro-MMP-2, while Testican-2 reverses this inhibition. Testican-1-specific inhibition blocks the formation of a pro-MMP-2, MT1-MMP, and TIMP-2 complex, and the eventual activating proteolytic cleavage. Inhibition of pro-MMP-2 activation reduces the breakdown and remodeling of the ECM, decreasing cellular metastatic potential because of MMP-2's active role in the degradation of type IV and V collagen and its facilitation of angiogenetic pathways.

=== Testican-1 ===
Uncontrolled ECM-degrading diseases, such as osteoarthritis, show upregulation of MMP-2 and reduced expression or activity of Testican-1. In a study from the University of Ulm's division for Biochemistry of Joint and Connective Tissue Diseases, hypertrophic chondrocytes derived from osteoarthritic growth plate cartilage revealed reduced matrix staining and expression. The decreased expression in damaged samples establishes a reduced detection of Testican-1 proteoglycans, further cementing Testican-1's significant role in ensuring normal ECM degradation and remodeling.

=== Testican-2 ===
As mentioned previously, testican-2 has a reciprocal function to testican-1 (and testican-3), promoting the activation of pro-MMP-2. Testican-2, using its flexible N-terminal domain, binds the extracellular calcium-binding domain of inhibitory testican isoforms, blocking their ability to bind and inhibit pro-MMP-2 activation. In a study from the Department of Molecular Virology and Oncology at Kanazawa University, expression assays showed that testican-2's positive regulation of MMP-2 activation is especially associated with astrocytic tumors.

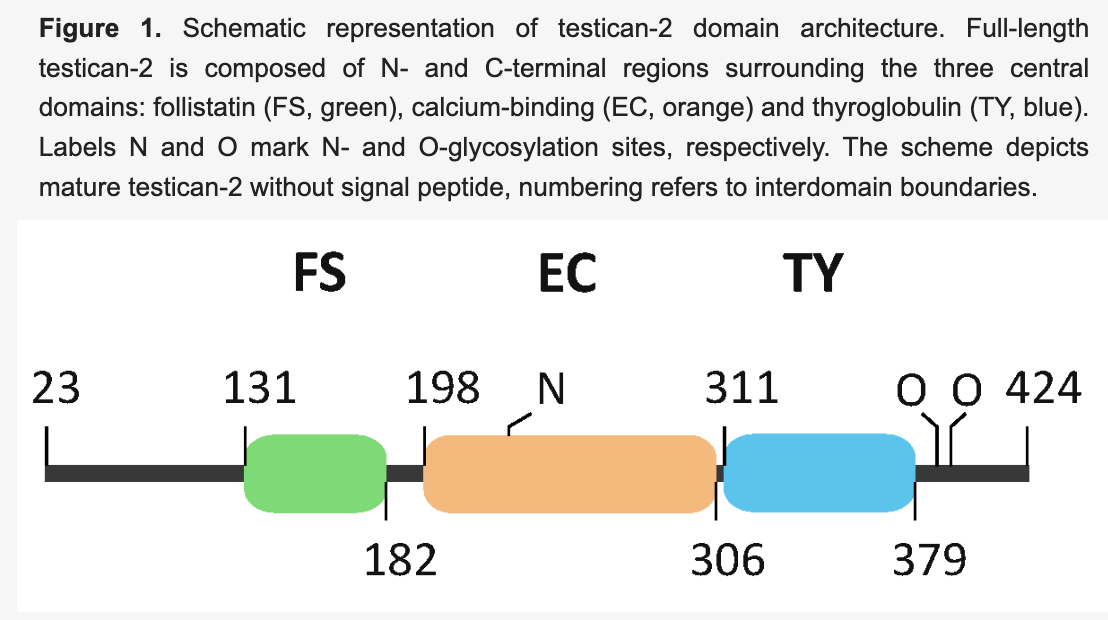
"—a unique N-terminal region followed by a follistatin-like domain (FS; containing a Kazal module), calcium-binding domain (EC), thyroglobulin type-1 domain (TY), and a C-terminal tail with heparan/chondroitin sulfate glycosaminoglycan (GAG) attachment sites at two serine residues [6,7,8]. Testicans are also termed SPOCKs for their SPARC/osteonectin (FS–EC), CWCV (TY), and Kazal-like domains..."

Other publications emphasize that testican-2 promotes accelerated ECM remodeling and metastasis in other specific tissue types, such as pancreatic. A 2025 Nature publication used immunofluorescence, western blotting, and knockdown/overexpression assays to quantify the impact of testican-2 activity on pancreatic β-cell proliferation. Testican 2's promotion of cellular growth further support a positive regulatory role of pancreatic ECM remodeling.

Another study from the department of biochemistry, molecular, and structural biology at University of Ljubljana, Slovenia, used biochemical and structural assay like that of calcium-binding and small angle x-ray scattering and modeling to confirm that testican-2's follistatin-like domain (FS), extracellular calcium-binding domain (EC), and thyroglobulin type-1 domain (TY) fold into a compact FS–EC–TY core that enables activity that promotes ECM remodeling and cellular mobility.

However, the N-terminal and C-terminal tails of testican-2 remain flexible. Interestingly, as previously mentioned, the N-terminal domain binds known inhibitory testicans, blocking their activity.
