= Xylan 1,3-β-xylosidase =

Class of enzymes

Identifiers
- EC no.: 3.2.1.72
- CAS no.: 37288-50-9

Databases
- IntEnz: IntEnz view
- BRENDA: BRENDA entry
- ExPASy: NiceZyme view
- KEGG: KEGG entry
- MetaCyc: metabolic pathway
- PRIAM: profile
- PDB structures: RCSB PDB PDBe PDBsum
Search
- PMC: articles
- PubMed: articles
- NCBI: proteins

Xylan 1,3-β-xylosidase (EC 3.2.1.72, 1,3-β-D-xylosidase, exo-1,3-β-xylosidase, β-1,3′-xylanase, exo-β-1,3′-xylanase, 1,3-β-D-xylan xylohydrolase) is an enzyme with systematic name 3-β-D-xylan xylohydrolase. It catalyses the hydrolysis of successive xylose residues from the non-reducing termini of (1→3)-β-D-xylans.
