= Flavonol-3-O-glycoside xylosyltransferase =

Class of enzymes

Identifiers
- EC no.: 2.4.2.35
- CAS no.: 83380-90-9

Databases
- IntEnz: IntEnz view
- BRENDA: BRENDA entry
- ExPASy: NiceZyme view
- KEGG: KEGG entry
- MetaCyc: metabolic pathway
- PRIAM: profile
- PDB structures: RCSB PDB PDBe PDBsum
- Gene Ontology: AmiGO / QuickGO
Search
- PMC: articles
- PubMed: articles
- NCBI: proteins

Flavonol-3-O-glycoside xylosyltransferase (EC 2.4.2.35) is an enzyme that catalyzes the general chemical reaction

UDP-D-xylose + a flavonol 3-O-glycoside $\rightleftharpoons$ UDP + a flavonol 3-[-D-xylosyl-(1->2)-beta-D-glycoside]

The two substrates of this enzyme characterised from tulip and Euonymus alatus are a flavonol 3-O-glycoside and UDP-D-xylose. The enzyme transfers the xylose sugar unit to give the corresponding flavonol 3-[-D-xylosyl-(1->2)-beta-D-glycoside, with uridine diphosphate (UDP) as a byproduct.

For example, rutin is converted to quercetin 3-(2G-xylosylrutinoside):

rutin
+ UDP-D-xylose
UDP
quercetin 3-(2G-xylosylrutinoside)

The enzyme is a glycosyltransferase, specifically a pentosyltransferases. The systematic name of this enzyme class is UDP-D-xylose:flavonol-3-O-glycoside 2''-O-beta-D-xylosyltransferase.
