= HS3ST1 =

Protein-coding gene in the species Homo sapiens

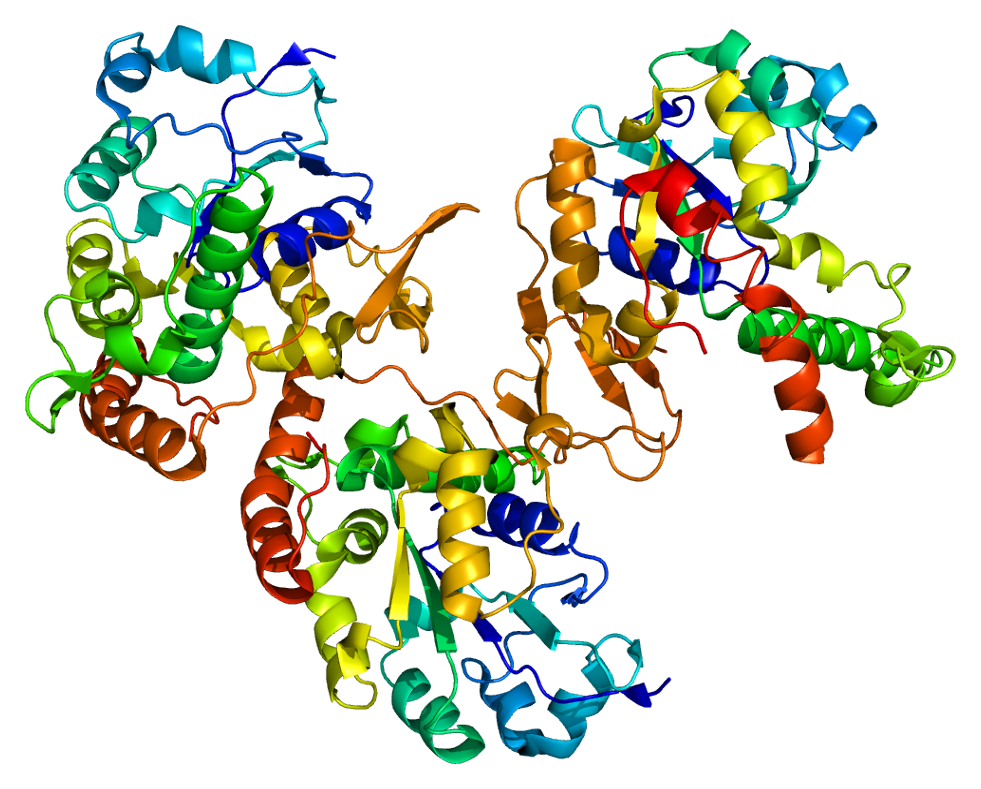

Identifiers
- Aliases: HS3ST1, 3OST, 3OST1, heparan sulfate-glucosamine 3-sulfotransferase 1
- External IDs: OMIM: 603244; MGI: 1201606; GeneCards: HS3ST1
Available structures
PDB	Ortholog search: PDBe RCSB
PDB	List of PDB id codes 1ZRH
Enzyme activity
EC #	BRENDA	ExPASy	KEGG	MetaCyc
2.8.2.23	↗	↗	↗	↗

Gene location (Human)
Chr.	Chromosome 4 (human)
Band	4p15.33	Start	11,393,150 bp
Band	4p15.33	End	11,429,564 bp

Gene location (Mouse)
Chr.	Chromosome 5 (mouse)
Band	5 B3|5 21.14 cM	Start	39,771,278 bp
Band	5 B3|5 21.14 cM	End	39,912,818 bp
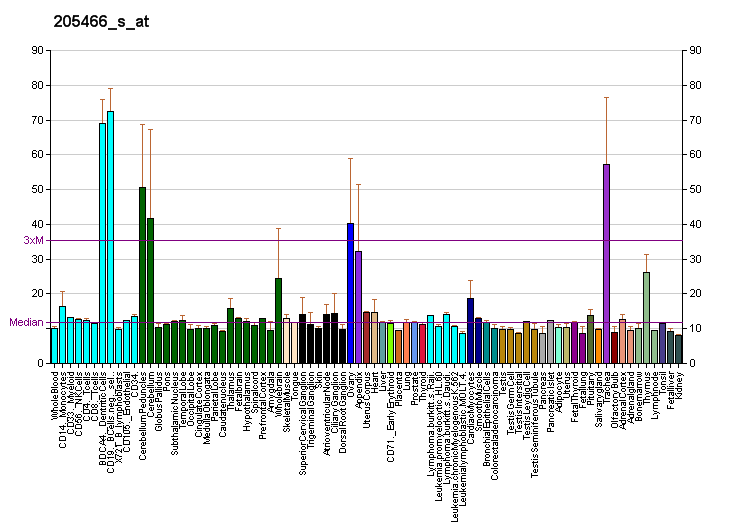

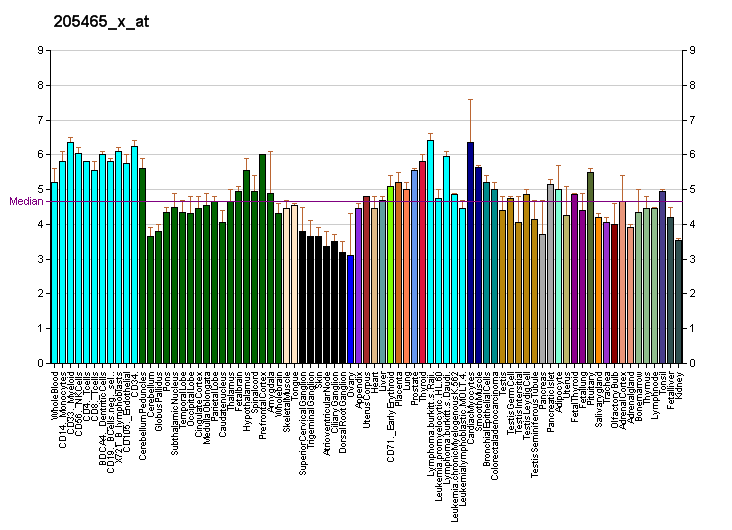
RNA expression pattern
Bgee	Human / Mouse (ortholog); Top expressed in: nasal epithelium; bronchial epithelial cell; mucosa of paranasal sinus; left ovary; caput epididymis; oral cavity; buccal mucosa cell; right ovary; palpebral conjunctiva; epithelium of nasopharynx / Top expressed in: cerebellar cortex; cumulus cell; lobe of cerebellum; olfactory bulb; dentate gyrus of hippocampal formation granule cell; gray matter layer of cerebellum; cerebellar vermis; primary visual cortex; ventricular zone; barrel cortex; More reference expression data
BioGPS	More reference expression data
Gene ontology
Molecular function	transferase activity; sulfotransferase activity; [heparan sulfate-glucosamine 3-sulfotransferase 1 activity]; heparan sulfate sulfotransferase activity
Cellular component	Golgi lumen; integral component of membrane; Golgi apparatus
Biological process	glycosaminoglycan biosynthetic process; heparan sulfate proteoglycan biosynthetic process
Sources:Amigo / QuickGO
Orthologs
Databases	NCBI: entry; OMA: entry
Species	Human	Mouse
Entrez	9957	15476
Ensembl	ENSG00000002587	ENSMUSG00000051022
UniProt	O14792	O35310
RefSeq (mRNA)	NM_005114	NM_010474
RefSeq (protein)	NP_005105	NP_034604
Location (UCSC)	Chr 4: 11.39 – 11.43 Mb	Chr 5: 39.77 – 39.91 Mb
PubMed search
- Wikidata
View/Edit Human	View/Edit Mouse

Heparan sulfate glucosamine 3-O-sulfotransferase 1 is an enzyme that in humans is encoded by the HS3ST1 gene.

== Function ==
Heparan sulfate biosynthetic enzymes are key components in generating a myriad of distinct heparan sulfate fine structures that carry out multiple biologic activities. The enzyme encoded by this gene is a member of the heparan sulfate biosynthetic enzyme family. It possesses both heparan sulfate glucosaminyl 3-O-sulfotransferase activity, anticoagulant heparan sulfate conversion activity, and is a rate limiting enzyme for synthesis of anticoagulant heparan. This enzyme is an intraluminal Golgi resident protein.

== Clinical significance ==
Polymorphisms in HS3ST1 appear to be a risk factor for developing Alzheimer's disease.
