= Xyloglucan 6-xylosyltransferase =

Class of enzymes

Identifiers
- EC no.: 2.4.2.39
- CAS no.: 80238-01-3

Databases
- IntEnz: IntEnz view
- BRENDA: BRENDA entry
- ExPASy: NiceZyme view
- KEGG: KEGG entry
- MetaCyc: metabolic pathway
- PRIAM: profile
- PDB structures: RCSB PDB PDBe PDBsum
Search
- PMC: articles
- PubMed: articles
- NCBI: proteins

In enzymology, a xyloglucan 6-xylosyltransferase (EC 2.4.2.39) is an enzyme that catalyzes the chemical reaction in which an alpha-D-xylosyl residue is transferred from UDP-D-xylose to a glucose residue in xyloglucan, being attached by an alpha-1,6-D-xylosyl-D-glucose bond.

This enzyme belongs to the family of glycosyltransferases, specifically the pentosyltransferases. The systematic name of this enzyme class is UDP-D-xylose:xyloglucan 1,6-alpha-D-xylosyltransferase. Other names in common use include uridine diphosphoxylose-xyloglucan 6alpha-xylosyltransferase, and xyloglucan 6-alpha-D-xylosyltransferase.
