= Biglycan =

Protein-coding gene in humans

BGN
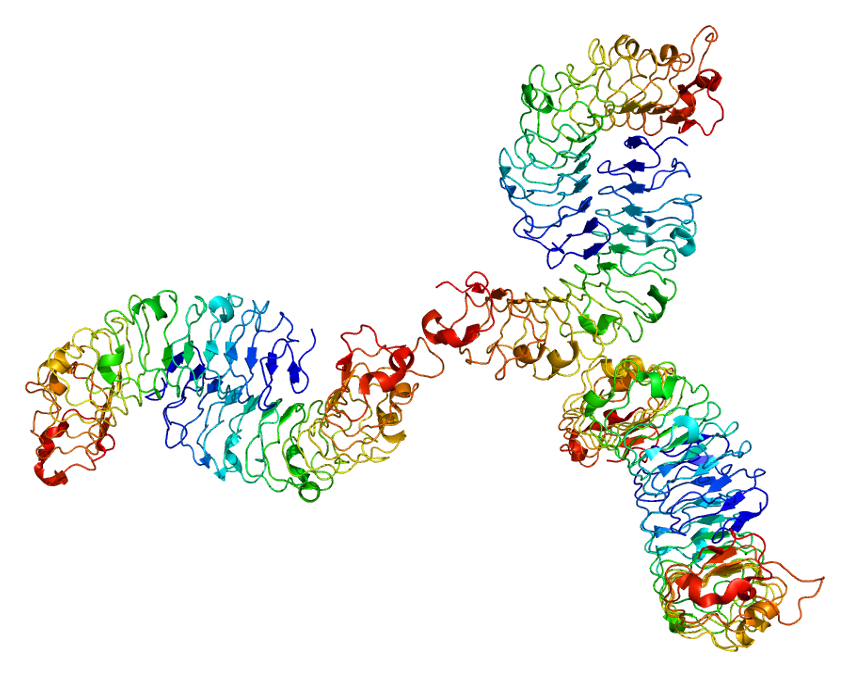

Identifiers
- Aliases: BGN, DSPG1, PG-S1, PGI, SLRR1A, biglycan, SEMDX, MRLS
- External IDs: OMIM: 301870; MGI: 88158; GeneCards: BGN

Gene location (Human)
Chr.	X chromosome (human)
Band	Xq28	Start	153,494,980 bp
Band	Xq28	End	153,509,546 bp

Gene location (Mouse)
Chr.	X chromosome (mouse)
Band	X A7.3|X 37.33 cM	Start	72,527,208 bp
Band	X A7.3|X 37.33 cM	End	72,539,539 bp
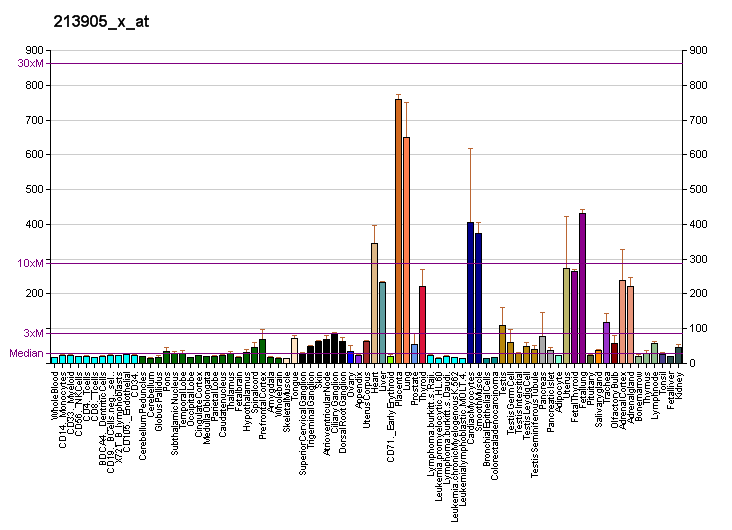

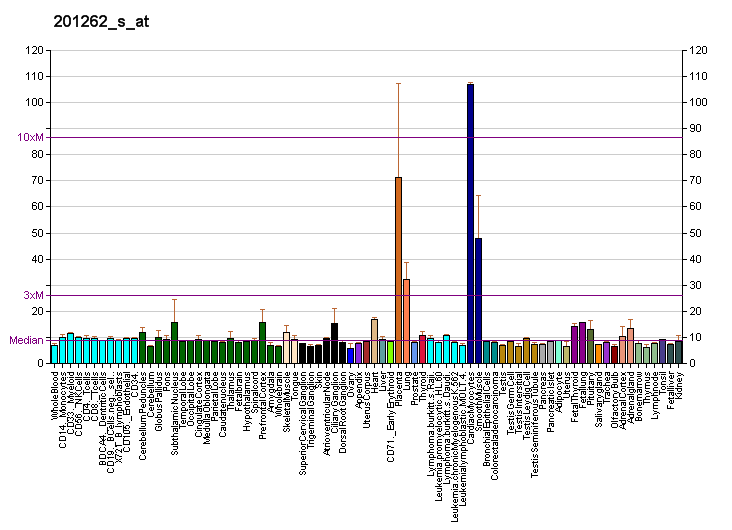

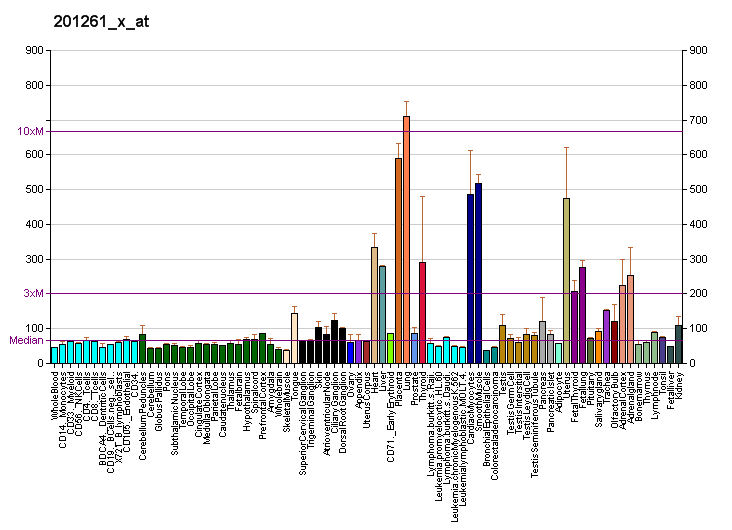
RNA expression pattern
Bgee	Human / Mouse (ortholog); Top expressed in: Descending thoracic aorta; ascending aorta; right coronary artery; tendon of biceps brachii; popliteal artery; tibial arteries; left coronary artery; tibia; right lung; gallbladder / Top expressed in: calvaria; tunica media of zone of aorta; stroma of bone marrow; ascending aorta; ankle joint; umbilical cord; body of femur; aortic valve; ankle; molar; More reference expression data
BioGPS	More reference expression data
Gene ontology
Molecular function	protein kinase inhibitor activity; glycosaminoglycan binding; extracellular matrix structural constituent; extracellular matrix binding; extracellular matrix structural constituent conferring compression resistance; protein binding
Cellular component	cytoplasm; extracellular matrix; intracellular anatomical structure; transport vesicle; cell surface; lysosomal lumen; Golgi lumen; sarcolemma; extracellular exosome; extracellular space; extracellular region; collagen-containing extracellular matrix
Biological process	glycosaminoglycan metabolic process; negative regulation of protein kinase activity; cytokine-mediated signaling pathway; chondroitin sulfate biosynthetic process; extracellular matrix organization; blood vessel remodeling; chondroitin sulfate catabolic process; peptide cross-linking via chondroitin 4-sulfate glycosaminoglycan; dermatan sulfate biosynthetic process; negative regulation of receptor signaling pathway via JAK-STAT; biological process
Sources:Amigo / QuickGO
Orthologs
Databases	NCBI: entry; OMA: entry
Species	Human	Mouse
Entrez	633	12111
Ensembl	ENSG00000182492	ENSMUSG00000031375
UniProt	P21810	P28653
RefSeq (mRNA)	NM_001711	NM_007542
RefSeq (protein)	NP_001702	NP_031568
Location (UCSC)	Chr X: 153.49 – 153.51 Mb	Chr X: 72.53 – 72.54 Mb
PubMed search
- Wikidata
View/Edit Human	View/Edit Mouse

Biglycan is a small leucine-rich repeat proteoglycan (SLRP) which is found in a variety of extracellular matrix tissues, including bone, cartilage and tendon. In humans, biglycan is encoded by the BGN gene which is located on the X chromosome.

The name "biglycan" was proposed in an article by Fisher, Termine and Young in an article in the Journal of Biological Chemistry in 1989 because the proteoglycan contained two GAG chains; formerly it was known as proteoglycan-I (PG-I).

== Structure ==
Biglycan consists of a protein core containing leucine-rich repeat regions and two glycosaminoglycan (GAG) chains consisting of either chondroitin sulfate (CS) or dermatan sulfate (DS), with DS being more abundant in most connective tissues. The CS/DS chains are attached at amino acids 5 and 10 in human biglycan. The composition of the GAG chains has been reported as varying according to tissue of origin. Non-glycanated forms of biglycan (no GAG chains) increase with age in human articular cartilage.

The composition of GAG chains of biglycan and decorin originating from the same tissue has been reported to be similar.

The structure of biglycan core protein is highly conserved across species; over 90% homology has been reported for rat, mouse, bovine and human biglycan core proteins.

== Function ==
Biglycan is believed to play a role in the mineralization of bone. Knock-out mice that have had the gene for biglycan suppressed (Bgn -/-) have an osteoporosis-like phenotype with reduced growth rate and lower bone mass than mice that can express biglycan.

Biglycan core protein binds to the growth factors BMP-4 and influences its bioactivity. It has also been reported that the presence of biglycan is necessary for BMP-4 to exert its effects on osteoblasts. There is also evidence that biglycan binds to TGF-beta 1.

== Interactions ==
Biglycan interacts with collagen, both via the core protein and GAG chains. It has been reported that biglycan interacts more strongly with collagen type II than collagen type I. Biglycan has been reported to compete with decorin for the same binding site on collagen.

Biglycan has been shown to interact with SGCA.

Biglycan is a particularly important proteoglycan for binding to lipoprotein in human blood vessels, thus being a significant cause of atherosclerosis.
