= Decorin =

Protein-coding gene in humans

DCN
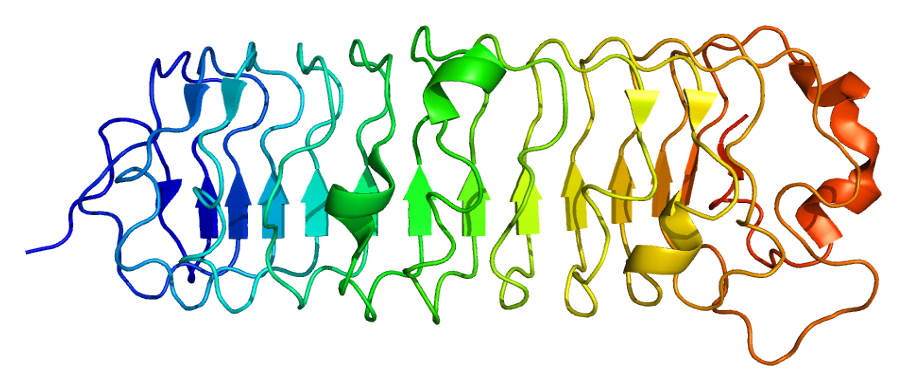

Identifiers
- Aliases: DCN, Dcn, DC, DSPG2, PG40, PGII, PGS2, SLRR1B, mDcn, CSCD, decorin
- External IDs: OMIM: 125255; MGI: 94872; GeneCards: DCN

Gene location (Human)
Chr.	Chromosome 12 (human)
Band	12q21.33	Start	91,140,484 bp
Band	12q21.33	End	91,183,217 bp

Gene location (Mouse)
Chr.	Chromosome 10 (mouse)
Band	10 C3|10 50.27 cM	Start	97,315,471 bp
Band	10 C3|10 50.27 cM	End	97,354,005 bp
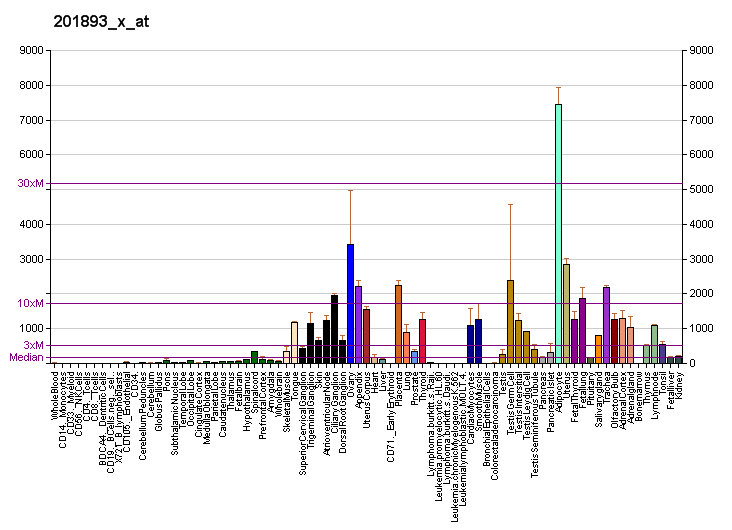

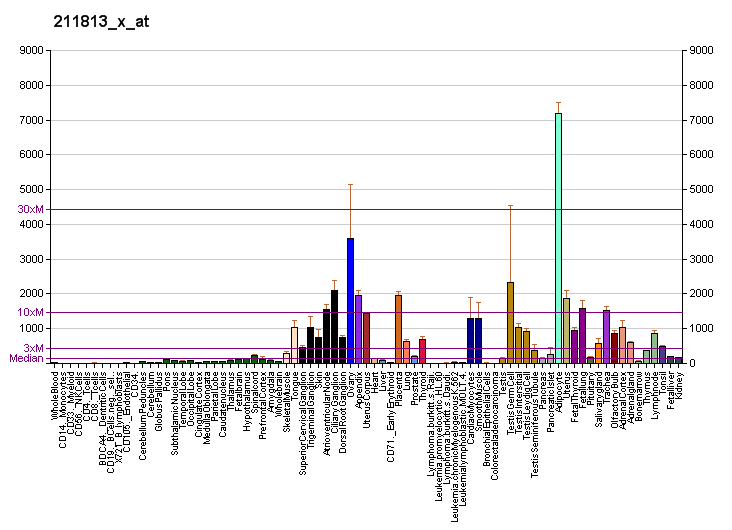

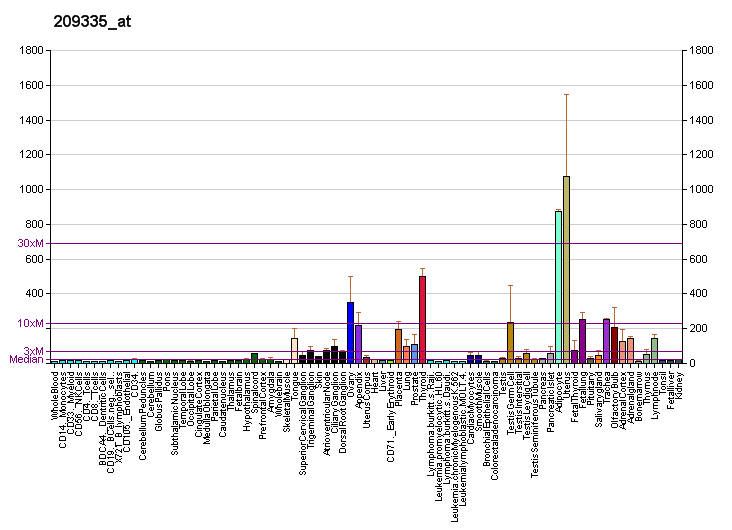
RNA expression pattern
Bgee	Human / Mouse (ortholog); Top expressed in: decidua; Achilles tendon; synovial joint; vena cava; tendon of biceps brachii; gallbladder; pericardium; tail of epididymis; skin of hip; stromal cell of endometrium / Top expressed in: sciatic nerve; umbilical cord; ankle; efferent ductule; iris; vestibular membrane of cochlear duct; cervix; skin of external ear; corneal stroma; calvaria; More reference expression data
BioGPS	More reference expression data
Gene ontology
Molecular function	collagen binding; protein N-terminus binding; protein kinase inhibitor activity; glycosaminoglycan binding; extracellular matrix binding; protein binding; RNA binding; extracellular matrix structural constituent conferring compression resistance
Cellular component	cytoplasm; extracellular matrix; lysosomal lumen; Golgi lumen; collagen type VI trimer; extracellular space; extracellular region; collagen-containing extracellular matrix
Biological process	glycosaminoglycan metabolic process; positive regulation of mitochondrial fission; negative regulation of protein kinase activity; positive regulation of autophagy; kidney development; cytokine-mediated signaling pathway; placenta development; chondroitin sulfate biosynthetic process; response to mechanical stimulus; ageing; extracellular matrix disassembly; extracellular matrix organization; wound healing; negative regulation of endothelial cell migration; positive regulation of macroautophagy; response to lipopolysaccharide; positive regulation of mitochondrial depolarization; animal organ morphogenesis; chondroitin sulfate catabolic process; negative regulation of angiogenesis; positive regulation of phosphatidylinositol 3-kinase signaling; peptide cross-linking via chondroitin 4-sulfate glycosaminoglycan; negative regulation of vascular endothelial growth factor signaling pathway; dermatan sulfate biosynthetic process; skeletal muscle tissue development; positive regulation of transcription by RNA polymerase II; negative regulation of receptor signaling pathway via JAK-STAT
Sources:Amigo / QuickGO
Orthologs
Databases	NCBI: entry; OMA: entry
Species	Human	Mouse
Entrez	1634	13179
Ensembl	ENSG00000011465	ENSMUSG00000019929
UniProt	P07585	P28654
RefSeq (mRNA)	NM_001920; NM_133503; NM_133504; NM_133505; NM_133506 NM_133507	NM_001190451; NM_007833
RefSeq (protein)	NP_001911; NP_598010; NP_598011; NP_598012; NP_598013 NP_598014	NP_001177380; NP_031859
Location (UCSC)	Chr 12: 91.14 – 91.18 Mb	Chr 10: 97.32 – 97.35 Mb
PubMed search
- Wikidata
View/Edit Human	View/Edit Mouse

Decorin is a protein that in humans is encoded by the DCN gene.

Decorin is a proteoglycan that is on average 90 - 140 kilodaltons (kDa) in molecular weight. It belongs to the small leucine-rich proteoglycan (SLRP) family and consists of a protein core containing leucine repeats with a glycosaminoglycan (GAG) chain consisting of either chondroitin sulfate (CS) or dermatan sulfate (DS).

Decorin is a small cellular or pericellular matrix proteoglycan and is closely related in structure to biglycan protein. Decorin and biglycan are thought to be the result of a gene duplication. This protein is a component of connective tissue, binds to type I collagen fibrils, and plays a role in matrix assembly.

== Naming ==
Decorin's name is a derivative of both the fact that it "decorates" collagen type I, and that it interacts with the "d" and "e" bands of fibrils of this collagen.

== Function ==
Decorin appears to influence fibrillogenesis, and also interacts with fibronectin, thrombospondin, the complement component C1q, epidermal growth factor receptor (EGFR) and transforming growth factor-beta (TGF-beta).

Decorin has been shown to either enhance or inhibit the activity of TGF-beta 1. The primary function of decorin involves regulation during the cell cycle.

It has been involved in the regulation of autophagy, of endothelial cell and inhibits angiogenesis. This process is mediated by a high-affinity interaction with VEGFR2 (vascular endothelial growth factor receptor) which leads to increased levels of tumor suppressor gene called PEG3. Other angiogenic growth factors that decorin inhibits are angiopoietin, hepatocyte growth factor (HGF) and platelet-derived growth factor (PDGF).

Decorin has recently been established as a myokine. In this role, it promotes muscle hypertrophy by binding with myostatin.

== Clinical significance ==
Keloid scars have decreased decorin expression compared to healthy skin. Development of congenital stromal corneal dystrophy is dependent on export and extracellular deposition of truncated decorin.

== Animal studies ==
Infusion of decorin into experimental rodent spinal cord injuries has been shown to suppress scar formation and promote axon growth.

Decorin has been shown to have anti-tumorigenic properties in an experimental murine tumor model and is capable of suppressing the growth of various tumor cell lines. The decorin-deficient knockout mouse shows reduced inflammatory reactions during contact dermatitis due to a defect in leukocyte recruitment and altered interferon gamma function.

== Interactions ==
Decorin has been shown to interact with:

- Collagen type I
- Epidermal growth factor receptor and
- TGF beta 1,
- TLR2, and
- TLR4.
