= SPOCK1 =

Protein-coding gene in the species Homo sapiens

Identifiers
- Aliases: SPOCK1, SPOCK, TESTICAN, TIC1, sparc/osteonectin, cwcv and kazal-like domains proteoglycan (testican) 1, SPARC/osteonectin, cwcv and kazal like domains proteoglycan 1, SPARC (osteonectin), cwcv and kazal like domains proteoglycan 1
- External IDs: OMIM: 602264; MGI: 105371; GeneCards: SPOCK1

Gene location (Human)
Chr.	Chromosome 5 (human)
Band	5q31.2	Start	136,975,298 bp
Band	5q31.2	End	137,598,379 bp

Gene location (Mouse)
Chr.	Chromosome 13 (mouse)
Band	13|13 B1	Start	57,569,008 bp
Band	13|13 B1	End	58,056,146 bp
RNA expression pattern
Bgee	Human / Mouse (ortholog); Top expressed in: stromal cell of endometrium; lateral nuclear group of thalamus; decidua; postcentral gyrus; Brodmann area 46; orbitofrontal cortex; cerebellar cortex; cerebellar hemisphere; superior frontal gyrus; right hemisphere of cerebellum / Top expressed in: medial dorsal nucleus; medial geniculate nucleus; superior frontal gyrus; primary visual cortex; olfactory system; olfactory epithelium; cerebellar cortex; Gray matter of spinal cord; anterior horn of spinal cord; dentate gyrus of hippocampal formation granule cell; More reference expression data
BioGPS	n/a
Gene ontology
Molecular function	calcium ion binding; cysteine-type endopeptidase inhibitor activity; metalloendopeptidase inhibitor activity; serine-type endopeptidase inhibitor activity; collagen binding; extracellular matrix binding
Cellular component	cytoplasm; postsynaptic density; neuromuscular junction; node of Ranvier; extracellular region; sarcoplasm; extracellular space
Biological process	negative regulation of cell-substrate adhesion; neurogenesis; negative regulation of neuron projection development; neuron migration; nervous system development; cell adhesion; regulation of cell growth; central nervous system neuron differentiation; signal transduction; negative regulation of endopeptidase activity
Sources:Amigo / QuickGO
Orthologs
Databases	NCBI: entry; OMA: entry
Species	Human	Mouse
Entrez	6695	20745
Ensembl	ENSG00000152377	ENSMUSG00000056222
UniProt	Q08629	Q62288
RefSeq (mRNA)	NM_004598	NM_001166463; NM_001166464; NM_001166465; NM_001166466; NM_009262
RefSeq (protein)	NP_004589	n/a
Location (UCSC)	Chr 5: 136.98 – 137.6 Mb	Chr 13: 57.57 – 58.06 Mb
PubMed search
- Wikidata
View/Edit Human	View/Edit Mouse

Testican-1 is a protein that in humans is encoded by the SPOCK1 gene.

This gene encodes the protein core of a seminal plasma proteoglycan containing chondroitin- and heparan-sulfate chains. The protein's function is under research, though it is from the same family of glycoproteins as SPARC. It is thought its similarity to thyropin-type cysteine protease inhibitors suggests its function may be related to protease inhibition.
