= HS3ST2 =

Protein-coding gene in the species Homo sapiens

Identifiers
- Aliases: HS3ST2, 30ST2, 3OST2, heparan sulfate-glucosamine 3-sulfotransferase 2
- External IDs: OMIM: 604056; MGI: 1333802; GeneCards: HS3ST2
Enzyme activity
EC #	BRENDA	ExPASy	KEGG	MetaCyc
2.8.2.29	↗	↗	↗	↗

Gene location (Human)
Chr.	Chromosome 16 (human)
Band	16p12.2	Start	22,814,162 bp
Band	16p12.2	End	22,916,338 bp

Gene location (Mouse)
Chr.	Chromosome 7 (mouse)
Band	7 F2|7 65.07 cM	Start	120,991,082 bp
Band	7 F2|7 65.07 cM	End	121,100,993 bp
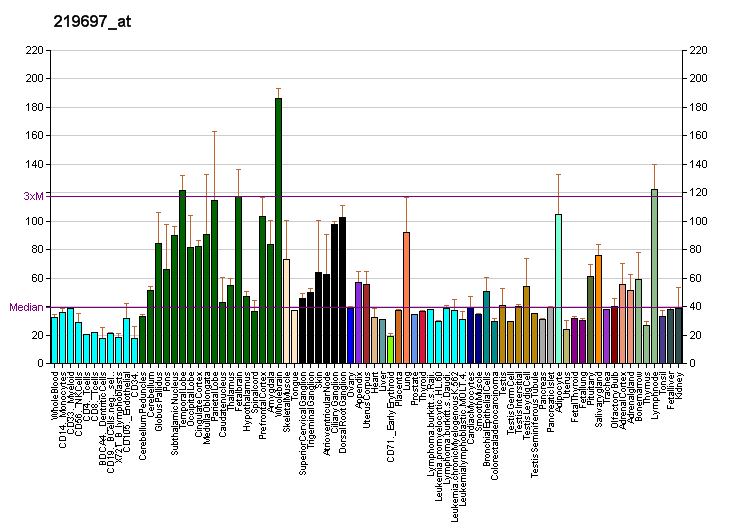
RNA expression pattern
Bgee	Human / Mouse (ortholog); Top expressed in: Brodmann area 46; orbitofrontal cortex; Region I of hippocampus proper; postcentral gyrus; superior frontal gyrus; dorsolateral prefrontal cortex; cingulate gyrus; anterior cingulate cortex; endothelial cell; Brodmann area 9 / Top expressed in: lumbar spinal ganglion; prefrontal cortex; primary motor cortex; lateral septal nucleus; superior frontal gyrus; visual cortex; molecular layer of cerebellar cortex; primary visual cortex; pineal gland; granular layer; More reference expression data
BioGPS	More reference expression data
Gene ontology
Molecular function	transferase activity; sulfotransferase activity; [heparan sulfate-glucosamine 3-sulfotransferase 2 activity]; [heparan sulfate-glucosamine 3-sulfotransferase 1 activity]; heparan sulfate sulfotransferase activity
Cellular component	integral component of membrane; Golgi membrane; Golgi apparatus; membrane
Biological process	circadian rhythm; glycosaminoglycan biosynthetic process; heparan sulfate proteoglycan biosynthetic process
Sources:Amigo / QuickGO
Orthologs
Databases	NCBI: entry; OMA: entry
Species	Human	Mouse
Entrez	9956	195646
Ensembl	ENSG00000122254	ENSMUSG00000046321
UniProt	Q9Y278	Q673U1
RefSeq (mRNA)	NM_006043	NM_001081327; NM_177575
RefSeq (protein)	NP_006034	NP_001074796
Location (UCSC)	Chr 16: 22.81 – 22.92 Mb	Chr 7: 120.99 – 121.1 Mb
PubMed search
- Wikidata
View/Edit Human	View/Edit Mouse

Heparan sulfate glucosamine 3-O-sulfotransferase 2 is an enzyme that in humans is encoded by the HS3ST2 gene.

Heparan sulfate biosynthetic enzymes are key components in generating a myriad of distinct heparan sulfate fine structures that carry out multiple biologic activities. The enzyme encoded by this gene is a member of the heparan sulfate biosynthetic enzyme family. It is a type II integral membrane protein and possesses heparan sulfate glucosaminyl 3-O-sulfotransferase activity. This gene is expressed predominantly in brain and may play a role in the nervous system.

Role in breast cancer The HS3ST2 promoter is hypermethylated in breast cancer tissue compared to normal breast ducts, suggesting a potential involvement in the pathogenesis of the disease. Functional analysis revealed that upregulation of HS3ST2 in human breast cancer cells resulted in altered invasiveness, which was due to changes in Mitogen-activated protein kinase signaling and matrix metalloproteinase expression.
