= CEP120 =

Protein-coding gene in the species Homo sapiens

Available structures
PDB	Ortholog search: PDBe RCSB
PDB	List of PDB id codes 4ICW, 4ICX

Identifiers
- Aliases: CEP120, CCDC100, SRTD13, centrosomal protein 120, JBTS31
- External IDs: OMIM: 613446; MGI: 2147298; HomoloGene: 27415; GeneCards: CEP120; OMA:CEP120 - orthologs

Gene location (Human)
Chr.	Chromosome 5 (human)
Band	5q23.2	Start	123,344,885 bp
Band	5q23.2	End	123,423,592 bp

Gene location (Mouse)
Chr.	Chromosome 18 (mouse)
Band	18|18 D1	Start	53,814,795 bp
Band	18|18 D1	End	53,877,680 bp
RNA expression pattern
Bgee	Human / Mouse (ortholog); Top expressed in: Achilles tendon; pancreatic epithelial cell; mucosa of paranasal sinus; thymus; germinal epithelium; superficial temporal artery; synovial membrane; secondary oocyte; cardiac muscle tissue of right atrium; epithelium of lactiferous gland / Top expressed in: superior cervical ganglion; interventricular septum; secondary oocyte; zygote; neural layer of retina; hand; primary oocyte; spermatocyte; seminiferous tubule; spermatid; More reference expression data
BioGPS	n/a
Gene ontology
Molecular function	protein C-terminus binding; protein binding
Cellular component	cytoplasm; microtubule organizing center; centrosome; cytoskeleton; centriole
Biological process	regulation of protein localization; interkinetic nuclear migration; neurogenesis; cell population proliferation; regulation of microtubule-based process; astral microtubule organization; microtubule cytoskeleton organization; cerebral cortex development; positive regulation of cilium assembly; positive regulation of centrosome duplication; centrosome cycle; positive regulation of centriole elongation; positive regulation of establishment of protein localization
Sources:Amigo / QuickGO
Orthologs
Species	Human	Mouse
Entrez	153241	225523
Ensembl	ENSG00000168944	ENSMUSG00000048799
UniProt	Q8N960	Q7TSG1
RefSeq (mRNA)	NM_001166226; NM_153223	NM_178686
RefSeq (protein)	NP_001159698; NP_694955; NP_001362334; NP_001362335; NP_001362336 NP_001362337; NP_001362338	NP_848801
Location (UCSC)	Chr 5: 123.34 – 123.42 Mb	Chr 18: 53.81 – 53.88 Mb
PubMed search
- Wikidata
View/Edit Human	View/Edit Mouse

Centrosomal protein of 120 kDa (Cep120), also known as coiled-coil domain-containing protein 100, is a protein that in humans is encoded by the CEP120 gene.

== Function ==
This gene encodes a protein that functions in the microtubule-dependent coupling of the nucleus and the centrosome. A similar protein in mouse plays a role in both interkinetic nuclear migration, which is a characteristic pattern of nuclear movement in neural progenitors, and in neural progenitor self-renewal. Mutations in this gene are predicted to result in neurogenic defects.
