= XYLT1 =

Protein-coding gene in humans

Identifiers
- Aliases: XYLT1, DBQD2, PXT-I, XT1, XTI, XYLTI, xylT-I, xylosyltransferase 1
- External IDs: OMIM: 608124; MGI: 2451073; GeneCards: XYLT1
Enzyme activity
EC #	BRENDA	ExPASy	KEGG	MetaCyc
2.4.2.26	↗	↗	↗	↗

Gene location (Human)
Chr.	Chromosome 16 (human)
Band	16p12.3	Start	17,101,769 bp
Band	16p12.3	End	17,470,960 bp

Gene location (Mouse)
Chr.	Chromosome 7 (mouse)
Band	7|7 F1	Start	116,980,214 bp
Band	7|7 F1	End	117,272,803 bp
RNA expression pattern
Bgee	Human / Mouse (ortholog); Top expressed in: tibia; cartilage tissue; hair follicle; Region I of hippocampus proper; Epithelium of choroid plexus; synovial joint; gingival epithelium; retinal pigment epithelium; entorhinal cortex; Brodmann area 23 / Top expressed in: subiculum; anterior amygdaloid area; primary motor cortex; deep cerebellar nuclei; retinal pigment epithelium; ventromedial nucleus; cingulate gyrus; paraventricular nucleus of hypothalamus; granulocyte; mammillary body; More reference expression data
BioGPS	n/a
Gene ontology
Molecular function	protein xylosyltransferase activity; transferase activity; acetylglucosaminyltransferase activity; glycosyltransferase activity; metal ion binding
Cellular component	integral component of membrane; extracellular region; Golgi apparatus; endoplasmic reticulum membrane; endoplasmic reticulum; membrane; Golgi membrane; Golgi cis cisterna; extracellular space
Biological process	chondroitin sulfate biosynthetic process; heparan sulfate proteoglycan biosynthetic process; glycosaminoglycan biosynthetic process; glycosaminoglycan metabolic process; proteoglycan biosynthetic process; ossification involved in bone maturation; embryonic skeletal system development; chondroitin sulfate proteoglycan biosynthetic process
Sources:Amigo / QuickGO
Orthologs
Databases	NCBI: entry; OMA: entry
Species	Human	Mouse
Entrez	64131	233781
Ensembl	ENSG00000103489; ENSG00000285395	ENSMUSG00000030657
UniProt	Q86Y38	Q811B1
RefSeq (mRNA)	NM_022166	NM_175645
RefSeq (protein)	NP_071449	NP_783576
Location (UCSC)	Chr 16: 17.1 – 17.47 Mb	Chr 7: 116.98 – 117.27 Mb
PubMed search
- Wikidata
View/Edit Human	View/Edit Mouse

Xylosyltransferase 1 is an enzyme that in humans is encoded by the XYLT1 gene.

Xylosyltransferase (XT; EC 2.4.2.26) catalyzes the transfer of UDP-xylose to serine residues within XT recognition sequences of target proteins. Addition of this xylose to the core protein is required for the biosynthesis of the glycosaminoglycan chains characteristic of proteoglycans.[supplied by OMIM]

== Clinical relevance ==
=== Baratela-Scott syndrome ===
In 2012 Baratela-Scott syndrome was identified in humans. A GGC repeat expansion, and methylation of exon 1 of XYLT1 is a common pathogenic variant in Baratela-Scott syndrome.

Patients with Baratela-Scott syndrome exhibit abnormal development of the skeleton, characteristic facial features, and cognitive developmental delay. Skeletal problems include knee cap in the wrong position, short long bones with mild changes to the narrow portion, short palm bones with stub thumbs, short thigh necks, shallow hip sockets, and malformations of the spine. Characteristic facial features include a flattened midface with a broad nasal bridge, cleft palate, and unibrow. The syndrome also cause pre-school onset of a cognitive developmental delay, with a shortened attention span. Some of the cognitive delay is masked by a warm and engaging personality.

=== Axon extension ===
Neurons use the presence of extracellular matrix molecules as clues whether to promote or suppress extension of axons. Chondroitin sulfate proteoglycans suppress the extension of axons over the glial scar, a barrier which develops after lesioning the spinal cord. Proteoglycans consist of one relatively small protein core and attached large glycosaminoglycan side chains. To block the very formation of these side chains xylosyltransferase (XYLT1) which attaches xylose to a serine of the protein core as initiation for glycosaminoglycan chain extension, was targeted by a class of designed DNA molecules. These molecules are called DNA-enzymes which were designed to specifically cleave XYLT1 mRNA within cells. DNA-enzymes are readily taken up by mammalian cells, but are more stable and require much lower concentrations then siRNA. XTYL1 DNA-enzyme in co-cultures of neurons with neurocan secreting cells displayed a marked increase of axon outgrowth. Rats with defined spinal cord lesions, i.a. the clinically relevant contusion injury, treated with XTYL1 DNA-enzyme administered by micro-infusion pumps or systemically achieved improvements in the horizontal ladder task, enhanced axonal plasticity, growth of the corticospinal tract, no effect on neuropathic pain when using mechanical and thermal allodynia tests and no toxicological or pathological side effects compared to control animals.
