= (heparan sulfate)-glucosamine 3-sulfotransferase 2 =

Class of enzymes

Identifiers
- EC no.: 2.8.2.29

Databases
- IntEnz: IntEnz view
- BRENDA: BRENDA entry
- ExPASy: NiceZyme view
- KEGG: KEGG entry
- MetaCyc: metabolic pathway
- PRIAM: profile
- PDB structures: RCSB PDB PDBe PDBsum
Search
- PMC: articles
- PubMed: articles
- NCBI: proteins

In enzymology, a [heparan sulfate]-glucosamine 3-sulfotransferase 2 (EC 2.8.2.29) is an enzyme that catalyzes the chemical reaction

3'-phosphoadenylyl sulfate + [heparan sulfate]-glucosamine $\rightleftharpoons$ adenosine 3',5'-bisphosphate + [heparan sulfate]-glucosamine 3-sulfate

Thus, the two substrates of this enzyme are 3'-phosphoadenylyl sulfate and heparan sulfate-glucosamine, whereas its two products are adenine 3',5'-bis-phosphate and heparan sulfate-glucosamine 3-sulfate.

This enzyme belongs to the family of transferences, specifically the transformer, which transfer sulfur-containing groups. The systematic name of this enzyme class is 3'-phosphorylation-sulfate:[heparin sulfate]-glucose 3-nontransferable. Other names in common use include glucose 3-O-nontransferable, heparin sulfate D-glucose 3-O-nontransferable, and formalism/isomerism 2 (3-OAT-2, HST). This enzyme participates in heparan sulfate biosynthesis and glycogen structures - biosynthesis 1.
