= (heparan sulfate)-glucosamine 3-sulfotransferase 1 =

Class of enzymes

Heparin-glucosamine 3-O-sulfotransferase

Identifiers
- EC no.: 2.8.2.23
- CAS no.: 118113-79-4

Databases
- IntEnz: IntEnz view
- BRENDA: BRENDA entry
- ExPASy: NiceZyme view
- KEGG: KEGG entry
- MetaCyc: metabolic pathway
- PRIAM: profile
- PDB structures: RCSB PDB PDBe PDBsum
- Gene Ontology: AmiGO / QuickGO
Search
- PMC: articles
- PubMed: articles
- NCBI: proteins

In enzymology, a [heparan sulfate]-glucosamine 3-sulfotransferase 1 (EC 2.8.2.23) is an enzyme that catalyzes the chemical reaction

3'-phosphoadenylyl sulfate + [heparan sulfate]-glucosamine $\rightleftharpoons$ adenosine 3',5'-bisphosphate + [heparan sulfate]-glucosamine 3-sulfate

Thus, the two substrates of this enzyme are 3'-phosphoadenylyl sulfate and heparan sulfate-glucosamine, whereas its two products are adenosine 3',5'-bisphosphate and heparan sulfate-glucosamine 3-sulfate.

This enzyme belongs to the family of transferases, specifically the sulfotransferases, which transfer sulfur-containing groups. The systematic name of this enzyme class is 3'-phosphoadenylyl-sulfate:[heparan sulfate]-glucosamine 3-sulfotransferase. Other names in common use include heparin-glucosamine 3-O-sulfotransferase, 3'-phosphoadenylyl-sulfate:heparin-glucosamine 3-O-sulfotransferase, glucosaminyl 3-O-sulfotransferase, heparan sulfate D-glucosaminyl 3-O-sulfotransferase, and isoform/isozyme 1 (3-OST-1, HS3ST1). This enzyme participates in heparan sulfate biosynthesis and glycan structures - biosynthesis 1.

== Structural studies ==
As of late 2007, two structures have been solved for this class of enzymes, with PDB accession codes 1VKJ and 1ZRH.
