= Zeatin O-beta-D-xylosyltransferase =

Class of enzymes

zeatin O-beta-D-xylosyltransferase

Identifiers
- EC no.: 2.4.2.40
- CAS no.: 110541-22-5

Databases
- IntEnz: IntEnz view
- BRENDA: BRENDA entry
- ExPASy: NiceZyme view
- KEGG: KEGG entry
- MetaCyc: metabolic pathway
- PRIAM: profile
- PDB structures: RCSB PDB PDBe PDBsum
- Gene Ontology: AmiGO / QuickGO
Search
- PMC: articles
- PubMed: articles
- NCBI: proteins

In enzymology, a zeatin O-beta-D-xylosyltransferase (EC 2.4.2.40) is an enzyme that catalyzes the chemical reaction

UDP-D-xylose + zeatin $\rightleftharpoons$ UDP + O-beta-D-xylosylzeatin

Thus, the two substrates of this enzyme are UDP-D-xylose and zeatin, whereas its two products are UDP and O-beta-D-xylosylzeatin.

This enzyme belongs to the family of glycosyltransferases, specifically the pentosyltransferases. The systematic name of this enzyme class is UDP-D-xylose:zeatin O-beta-D-xylosyltransferase. Other names in common use include uridine diphosphoxylose-zeatin xylosyltransferase, and zeatin O-xylosyltransferase.
