= Heparan sulfate =

Macromolecule

Structure formula of one of the many sulfation patterns of the heparan sulfate subunit

Heparan sulfate (HS) is a linear polysaccharide found in all animal tissues. It occurs in the form of a proteoglycan (heparan sulfate proteoglycan; HSPG) in which two or three HS chains are attached in close proximity to cell surface or extracellular matrix proteins. In this form, HS binds to a variety of protein ligands, including Wnt signaling pathways, and regulates a wide range of biological activities, including developmental processes, angiogenesis, blood coagulation, abolishing detachment activity by granzyme B (GrB), and tumour metastasis.

HS has also been shown to serve as cellular receptor for a number of viruses, including the respiratory syncytial virus. One study suggests that cellular HS has a role in SARS-CoV-2 infection, particularly when the virus attaches with ACE2. The basic repeat unit synthesised by the EXT1/EXT2 heterocomplex is (GlcAβ1,4GlcNAcα1,4)n.

== Proteoglycans ==
The major cell membrane HSPGs are the transmembrane syndecans and the glycosylphosphatidylinositol (GPI) anchored glypicans. Other minor forms of membrane HSPG include betaglycan and the V-3 isoform of CD44 present on keratinocytes and activated monocytes.

In the extracellular matrix, especially basement membranes and fractones, the multi-domain perlecan, agrin and collagen XVIII core proteins are the main HS-bearing species.

== Structure and differences from heparin ==
Heparan sulfate is a member of the glycosaminoglycan (GAG) family of carbohydrates and is very closely related in structure to heparin. Both consist of a variably sulfated repeating disaccharide unit. The main disaccharide units that occur in heparan sulfate and heparin are shown below.

The most common disaccharide unit within heparan sulfate is composed of a glucuronic acid (GlcA) linked to N-acetylglucosamine (GlcNAc), typically making up around 50% of the total disaccharide units. Compare this to heparin, where IdoA(2S)-GlcNS(6S) makes up 85% of heparins from beef lung and about 75% of those from porcine intestinal mucosa. Problems arise when defining hybrid GAGs that contain both 'heparin-like' and 'HS-like' structures. It has been suggested that a GAG should qualify as heparin only if its content of N-sulfate groups largely exceeds that of N-acetyl groups and the concentration of O-sulfate groups exceeds those of N-sulfate. Otherwise, it should be classified as HS.

Not shown below are the rare disaccharides containing a 3-O-sulfated glucosamine (GlcNS(3S,6S) or a free amine group (GlcNH_{3}^{+}). Under physiological conditions the ester and amide sulfate groups are deprotonated and attract positively charged counterions to form a salt. It is in this form that HS is thought to exist at the cell surface.

GlcA-GlcNAc

GlcA-GlcNS

IdoA-GlcNS

IdoA(2S)-GlcNS

IdoA-GlcNS(6S)

IdoA(2S)-GlcNS(6S)

=== Abbreviations ===
- GAG = glycosaminoglycan
- GlcA = β-D-glucuronic acid
- IdoA = α-L-iduronic acid
- IdoA(2S) = 2-O-sulfo-α-L-iduronic acid
- GlcNAc = 2-deoxy-2-acetamido-α-D-glucopyranosyl
- GlcNS = 2-deoxy-2-sulfamido-α-D-glucopyranosyl
- GlcNS(6S) = 2-deoxy-2-sulfamido-α-D-glucopyranosyl-6-O-sulfate

== Biosynthesis ==
Many different cell types produce HS chains with many different primary structures. Therefore, there is a great deal of variability in the way HS chains are synthesised, producing structural diversity encompassed by the term "heparanome" - which defines the full range of primary structures produced by a particular cell, tissue or organism. However, essential to the formation of HS regardless of primary sequence is a range of biosynthetic enzymes. These enzymes consist of multiple glycosyltransferases, sulfotransferases and an epimerase. These same enzymes also synthesize heparin.

In the 1980s, Jeffrey Esko was the first to isolate and characterize animal cell mutants altered in the assembly of heparan sulfate. Many of these enzymes have now been purified, molecularly cloned and their expression patterns studied. From this and early work on the fundamental stages of HS/heparin biosynthesis using a mouse mastocytoma cell free system a lot is known about the order of enzyme reactions and specificity.

Patients with Multiple Hereditary Exostoses lack the ability to biosynthesize HS.

=== Chain initiation ===
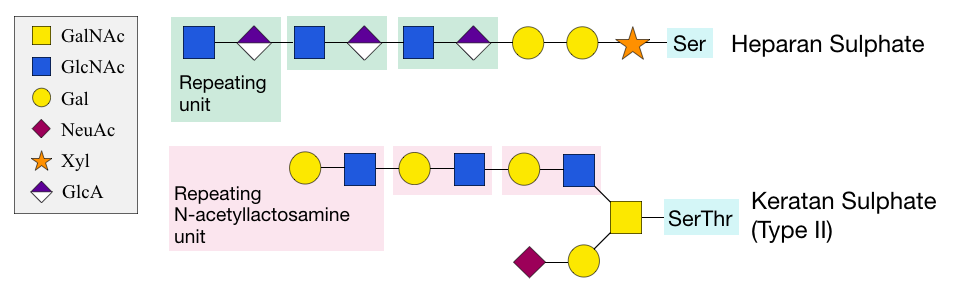
Structures of heparan sulphate and keratan sulphate, formed by the addition of xylose or GalNAc sugars, respectively, onto serine and threonine residues of proteins.

HS synthesis initiates with the transfer of xylose from UDP-xylose by xylosyltransferase (XT) to specific serine residues within the protein core. Attachment of two galactose (Gal) residues by galactosyltransferases I and II (GalTI and GalTII) and glucuronic acid (GlcA) by glucuronosyltransferase I (GlcATI) completes the formation of a tetrasaccharide primer O-linked to a serine of the core-protein:

βGlcUA-(1→3)-βGal-(1→3)-βGal-(1→4)-βXyl-O-Ser.

The pathways for HS/heparin or chondroitin sulfate (CS) and dermatan sulfate (DS) biosynthesis diverge after the formation of this common tetrasaccharide linkage structure. The next enzyme to act, GlcNAcT-I or GalNAcT-I, directs synthesis, either to HS/heparin or CS/DS, respectively.

Xylose attachment to the core protein is thought to occur in the endoplasmic reticulum (ER) with further assembly of the linkage region and the remainder of the chain occurring in the Golgi apparatus.

=== Chain elongation ===
After attachment of the first N-acetylglucosamine (GlcNAc) residue, elongation of the tetrasacchride linker is continued by the stepwise addition of GlcA and GlcNAc residues. These are transferred from their respective UDP-sugar nucleotides. This is carried out by EXT family proteins with glycosyltransferase activities. EXT family genes are tumor suppressors.

Mutations at the EXT1-3 gene loci in humans lead to an inability of cells to produce HS and to the development of the disease Multiple Hereditary Exostoses (MHE). MHE is characterized by cartilage-capped tumours, known as osteochondromas or exostoses, which develop primarily on the long bones of affected individuals from early childhood until puberty.

=== Chain modification ===
As an HS chain polymerises, it undergoes a series of modification reactions carried out by four classes of sulfotransferases and an epimerase. The availability of the sulfate donor PAPS is crucial to the activity of the sulfotransferases.

=== N-deacetylation/N-sulfation ===
The first polymer modification is the N-deacetylation/N-sulfation of GlcNAc residues into GlcNS. This is a prerequisite for all subsequent modification reactions, and is carried out by one or more members of a family of four GlcNAc N-deacetylase/N-sulfotransferase enzymes (NDSTs). In early studies, it was shown that modifying enzymes could recognize and act on any N-acetylated residue in the forming polymer. Therefore, the modification of GlcNAc residues should occur randomly throughout the chain. However, in HS, N-sulfated residues are mainly grouped together and separated by regions of N-acetylation where GlcNAc remains unmodified.

There are four isoforms of NDST (NDST1–4). Both N-deacetylase and N-sulfotransferase activities are present in all NDST-isoforms but they differ significantly in their enzymatic activities.

=== Generation of GlcNH_{2} ===
Due to the N-deacetylase and N-sulfotransferase being carried out by the same enzyme N-sulfation is normally tightly coupled to N-acetylation. GlcNH_{2} residues resulting from apparent uncoupling of the two activities have been found in heparin and some species of HS.

=== Epimerisation and 2-O-sulfation ===
Epimerisation is catalysed by one enzyme, the GlcA C5 epimerase or heparosan-N-sulfate-glucuronate 5-epimerase (EC 5.1.3.17). This enzyme epimerases GlcA to iduronic acid (IdoA). Substrate recognition requires that the GlcN residue linked to the non-reducing side of a potential GlcA target be N-sulfated. Uronosyl-2-O-sulfotransferase (2OST) sulfates the resulting IdoA residues.

=== 6-O-sulfation ===
Three glucosaminyl 6-O-transferases (6OSTs) have been identified that result in the formation of GlcNS(6S) adjacent to sulfated or non-sulfated IdoA. GlcNAc(6S) is also found in mature HS chains.

=== 3-O-sulfation ===
Currently seven glucosaminyl 3-O-sulfotransferases (3OSTs, HS3STs) are known to exist in mammals (eight in zebrafish). The 3OST enzymes create a number of possible 3-O-sulfated disaccharides, including GlcA-GlcNS(3S±6S) (modified by HS3ST1 and HS3ST5), IdoA(2S)-GlcNH_{2}(3S±6S)(modified by HS3ST3A1, HS3ST3B1, HS3ST5 and HS3ST6) and GlcA/IdoA(2S)-GlcNS(3S) (modified by HS3ST2 and HS3ST4). As with all other HS sulfotransferases, the 3OSTs use 3'-phosphoadenosine-5'-phosphosulfate (PAPS) as a sulfate donor. Despite being the largest family of HS modification enzymes, the 3OSTs produce the rarest HS modification, the 3-O-sulfation of specific glucosamine residues at the C3-OH moiety.

The 3OSTs are divided into two functional subcategories, those that generate an antithrombin III binding site (HS3ST1 and HS3ST5) and those that generate a herpes simplex virus 1 glycoprotein D (HSV-1 gD) binding site (HS3ST2, HS3ST3A1, HS3ST3B1, HS3ST4, HS3ST5 and HS3ST6). As the 3OSTs are the largest family of HS modification enzymes and their actions are rate-limiting, substrate specific and produce rare modifications, it has been hypothesized that 3OST modified HS plays an important regulatory role in biological processes. It has been demonstrated that 3-O-sulfation can enhance the binding of Wnt to the glypican and may play a role in regulating Wnt in cancer.

== Ligand binding ==
Heparan sulfate binds with a large number of extracellular proteins. These are often collectively called the “heparin interactome” or "heparin-binding proteins", because they are isolated by affinity chromatography on the related polysaccharide heparin, though the term “heparan sulfate interactome” is more correct. The functions of heparan sulfate binding proteins ranges from extracellular matrix components, to enzymes and coagulation factors, and most growth factors, cytokines, chemokines and morphogens The laboratory of Mitchell Ho at the NCI isolated the HS20 human monoclonal antibody with high affinity for heparan sulfate by phage display. The antibody binds heparan sulfate, not chondroitin sulfate. The binding of HS20 to heparan sulfate requires sulfation at both the C2 position and C6 position. HS20 blocks the Wnt binding on heparan sulfate and also inhibits infectious entry of pathogenic JC polyomavirus.

=== Interferon-γ ===
The cell surface receptor binding region of Interferon-γ overlaps with the HS binding region, near the protein's C-terminal. Binding of HS blocks the receptor binding site and as a result, protein-HS complexes are inactive.

=== Wnt ===
Glypican-3 (GPC3) interacts with both Wnt and Frizzled to form a complex and triggers downstream signaling. It has been experimentally established that Wnt recognizes a heparan sulfate motif on GPC3, which contains IdoA2S and GlcNS6S, and that the 3-O-sulfation in GlcNS6S3S enhances the binding of Wnt to the glypican.

The HS-binding properties of a number of other proteins are also being studied:

- Antithrombin III
- Fibroblast growth factor
- Hepatocyte growth factor
- Interleukin-8
- Vascular endothelial growth factor
- Wnt/Wingless
- Endostatin

== Heparan sulfate analogue ==
Heparan sulfate analogues are thought to display identical properties as heparan sulfate with exception of being stable in a proteolytic environment like a wound. Because heparan sulfate is broken down in chronic wounds by heparanase, the analogues only bind sites where natural heparan sulfate is absent and is thus resistant to enzyme degradation. Also the function of the heparan sulfate analogues is the same as heparan sulfate, protecting a variety of protein ligands such as growth factors and cytokines. By holding them in place, the tissue can then use the different protein ligands for proliferation.

== Associated conditions ==
Hereditary multiple exostoses (also known as multiple hereditary exostoses or multiple osteochondromas) is a hereditary disease with mutations on the EXT1 and EXT2 genes that affect biosynthesis of heparan sulfate.

Sanfilippo syndrome (also known as mucopolysaccharidosis type III (MPS III)) is a rare neurodegenerative pediatric disease in which mutations result in an inability to break down heparan sulfate. People with this condition thus have an accumulation of heparan sulfate in their cerebrospinal fluid (CSF).
