= HS3ST3B1 =

Protein-coding gene in the species Homo sapiens

Identifiers
- Aliases: HS3ST3B1, 30ST3B1, 3OST3B1, 3-OST-3B, h3-OST-3B, heparan sulfate-glucosamine 3-sulfotransferase 3B1
- External IDs: OMIM: 604058; MGI: 1333853; GeneCards: HS3ST3B1
Enzyme activity
EC #	BRENDA	ExPASy	KEGG	MetaCyc
2.8.2.30	↗	↗	↗	↗

Gene location (Human)
Chr.	Chromosome 17 (human)
Band	17p12	Start	14,301,081 bp
Band	17p12	End	14,349,404 bp

Gene location (Mouse)
Chr.	Chromosome 11 (mouse)
Band	11 B3|11 39.47 cM	Start	63,776,618 bp
Band	11 B3|11 39.47 cM	End	63,813,116 bp
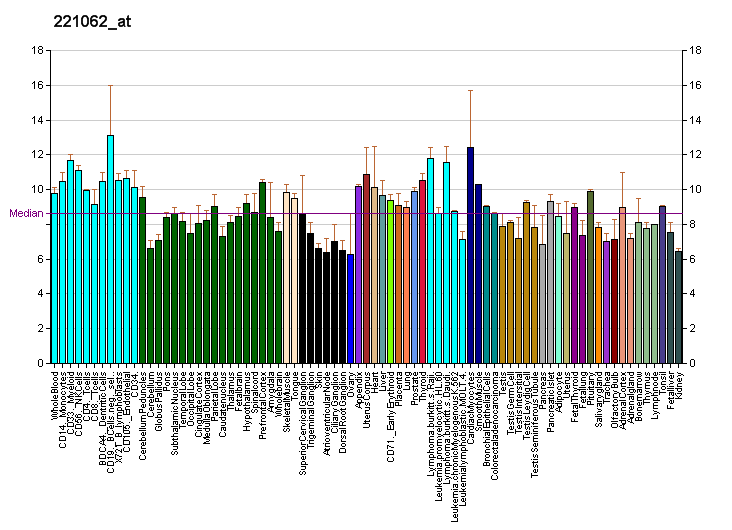
RNA expression pattern
Bgee	Human / Mouse (ortholog); Top expressed in: tibia; parotid gland; epithelium of nasopharynx; right lobe of liver; palpebral conjunctiva; placenta; cartilage tissue; gingival epithelium; germinal epithelium; stromal cell of endometrium / Top expressed in: epithelium of stomach; left lobe of liver; renal corpuscle; female external genitalia; paramesonephric duct; retinal pigment epithelium; ciliary body; neural layer of retina; cornea; abdominal wall; More reference expression data
BioGPS	More reference expression data
Gene ontology
Molecular function	transferase activity; sulfotransferase activity; [heparan sulfate-glucosamine 3-sulfotransferase 3 activity]; [heparan sulfate-glucosamine 3-sulfotransferase 1 activity]; heparan sulfate sulfotransferase activity
Cellular component	integral component of membrane; Golgi membrane; Golgi apparatus; integral component of plasma membrane; membrane
Biological process	heparan sulfate proteoglycan biosynthetic process; heparan sulfate proteoglycan biosynthetic process, enzymatic modification; glycosaminoglycan biosynthetic process; protein sulfation
Sources:Amigo / QuickGO
Orthologs
Databases	NCBI: entry; OMA: entry
Species	Human	Mouse
Entrez	9953	54710
Ensembl	ENSG00000125430	ENSMUSG00000070407
UniProt	Q9Y662	Q9QZS6
RefSeq (mRNA)	NM_006041	NM_018805
RefSeq (protein)	NP_006032	NP_061275
Location (UCSC)	Chr 17: 14.3 – 14.35 Mb	Chr 11: 63.78 – 63.81 Mb
PubMed search
- Wikidata
View/Edit Human	View/Edit Mouse

Heparan sulfate glucosamine 3-O-sulfotransferase 3B1 is an enzyme that in humans is encoded by the HS3ST3B1 gene. Heparan sulfate biosynthetic enzymes are key components in generating myriad distinct heparan sulfate fine structures that carry out multiple biologic activities. The enzyme encoded by this gene is a member of the heparan sulfate biosynthetic enzyme family. It is a type II integral membrane protein and possesses heparan sulfate glucosaminyl 3-O-sulfotransferase activity ( HS3ST3A1). The Sulfotransferase domain of this enzyme is highly similar to the same domain of heparan sulfate D-glucosaminyl 3-O-sulfotransferase 3A1 and these two enzymes sulfate an identical disaccharide. This gene is widely expressed, with the most abundant expression in liver and placenta.
