= Glycoprotein 2-beta-D-xylosyltransferase =

Class of enzymes

glycoprotein 2-beta-D-xylosyltransferase

Identifiers
- EC no.: 2.4.2.38
- CAS no.: 141256-56-6

Databases
- IntEnz: IntEnz view
- BRENDA: BRENDA entry
- ExPASy: NiceZyme view
- KEGG: KEGG entry
- MetaCyc: metabolic pathway
- PRIAM: profile
- PDB structures: RCSB PDB PDBe PDBsum
- Gene Ontology: AmiGO / QuickGO
Search
- PMC: articles
- PubMed: articles
- NCBI: proteins

In enzymology, a glycoprotein 2-beta-D-xylosyltransferase (EC 2.4.2.38) is an enzyme that catalyzes the chemical reaction

UDP-D-xylose + N_{4}-{N-acetyl-beta-D-glucosaminyl-(1->2)-alpha-D-mannosyl-(1->3)-[N- acetyl-beta-D-glucosaminyl-(1->2)-alpha-D-mannosyl-(1->6)]-beta-D- mannosyl-(1->4)-N-acetyl-beta-D-glucosaminyl-(1->4)-N-acetyl-beta-D- glucosaminyl}asparagine $\rightleftharpoons$ UDP + N_{4}-{N-acetyl-beta-D-glucosaminyl-(1->2)-alpha-D-mannosyl-(1->3)-[N- acetyl-beta-D-glucosaminyl-(1->2)-alpha-D-mannosyl-(1->6)]-[beta-D- xylosyl-(1->2)]-beta-D-mannosyl-(1->4)-N-acetyl-beta-D-glucosaminyl- (1->4)-N-acetyl-beta-D-glucosaminyl}asparagine

The 5 substrates of this enzyme are UDP-D-xylose, [[N4-{N-acetyl-beta-D-glucosaminyl-(1->2)-alpha-D-mannosyl-(1->3)-[N-]], [[acetyl-beta-D-glucosaminyl-(1->2)-alpha-D-mannosyl-(1->6)]-beta-D-]], [[mannosyl-(1->4)-N-acetyl-beta-D-glucosaminyl-(1->4)-N-acetyl-beta-D-]], and [[glucosaminyl}asparagine]], whereas its 5 products are UDP, [[N4-{N-acetyl-beta-D-glucosaminyl-(1->2)-alpha-D-mannosyl-(1->3)-[N-]], [[acetyl-beta-D-glucosaminyl-(1->2)-alpha-D-mannosyl-(1->6)]]-beta-D-, [[xylosyl-(1->2)]-beta-D-mannosyl-(1->4)-N-acetyl-beta-D-glucosaminyl-]], and [[(1->4)-N-acetyl-beta-D-glucosaminyl}asparagine]].

This enzyme belongs to the family of glycosyltransferases, specifically the pentosyltransferases. The systematic name of this enzyme class is UDP-D-xylose:glycoprotein (D-xylose to the 3,6-disubstituted mannose of N4-{N-acetyl-beta-D-glucosaminyl-(1->2)-alpha-D-mannosyl-(1->3)-[N-a cetyl-beta-D-glucosaminyl-(1->2)-alpha-D-mannosyl-(1->6)]-beta-D-man nosyl-(1->4)-N-acetyl-beta-D-glucosaminyl-(1->4)-N-acetyl-beta-D-glu cosaminyl}asparagine) 2-beta-D-xylosyltransferase. Other names in common use include beta1,2-xylosyltransferase, UDP-D-xylose:glycoprotein (D-xylose to the 3,6-disubstituted mannose, of, 4-N-{N-acetyl-beta-D-glucosaminyl-(1->2)-alpha-D-mannosyl-(1->3)-[N-, acetyl-beta-D-glucosaminyl-(1->2)-alpha-D-mannosyl-(1->6)]-beta-D-, mannosyl-(1->4)-N-acetyl-beta-D-glucosaminyl-(1->4)-N-acetyl-beta-D-, and glucosaminyl}asparagine) 2-beta-D-xylosyltransferase. This enzyme participates in glycan structures - biosynthesis 1.
