= HS3ST3A1 =

Protein-coding gene in the species Homo sapiens

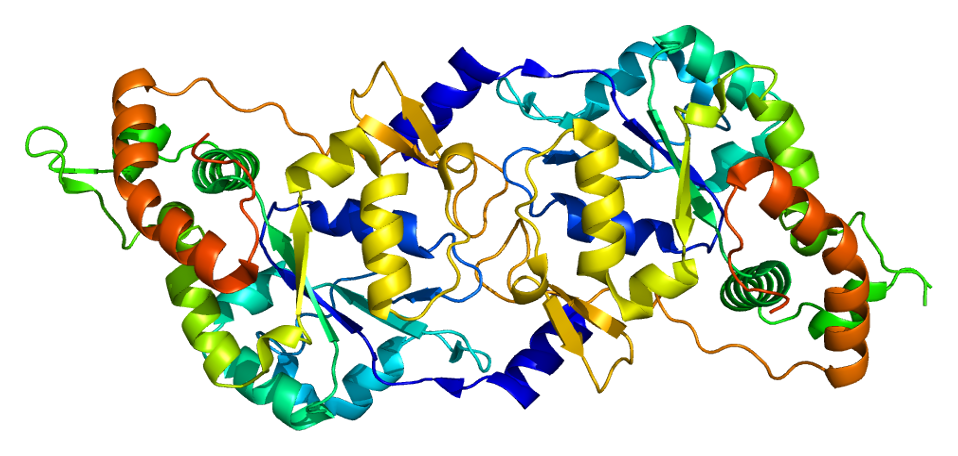

Identifiers
- Aliases: HS3ST3A1, 30ST3A1, 3OST3A1, 3-OST-3A, heparan sulfate-glucosamine 3-sulfotransferase 3A1
- External IDs: OMIM: 604057; MGI: 1333861; GeneCards: HS3ST3A1
Available structures
PDB	Ortholog search: PDBe RCSB
PDB	List of PDB id codes 1T8T, 1T8U
Enzyme activity
EC #	BRENDA	ExPASy	KEGG	MetaCyc
2.8.2.30	↗	↗	↗	↗

Gene location (Human)
Chr.	Chromosome 17 (human)
Band	17p12	Start	13,494,032 bp
Band	17p12	End	13,601,929 bp

Gene location (Mouse)
Chr.	Chromosome 11 (mouse)
Band	11 B3|11 40.24 cM	Start	64,326,158 bp
Band	11 B3|11 40.24 cM	End	64,413,667 bp
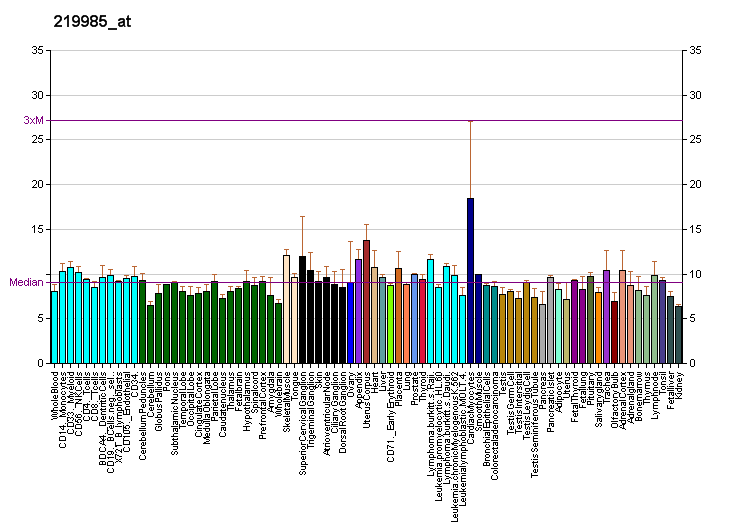
RNA expression pattern
Bgee	Human / Mouse (ortholog); Top expressed in: cartilage tissue; testicle; tibia; gingival epithelium; oral cavity; glomerulus; metanephric glomerulus; seminal vesicula; stromal cell of endometrium; germinal epithelium / Top expressed in: metatarsal bones; condyle; second metatarsal bone; fifth metatarsal bone; iris; footplate; Gonadal ridge; third metatarsal bone; ciliary body; renal corpuscle; More reference expression data
BioGPS	More reference expression data
Gene ontology
Molecular function	transferase activity; sulfotransferase activity; [heparan sulfate-glucosamine 3-sulfotransferase 3 activity]; [heparan sulfate-glucosamine 3-sulfotransferase 1 activity]; heparan sulfate sulfotransferase activity
Cellular component	integral component of membrane; Golgi membrane; Golgi apparatus; membrane
Biological process	glycosaminoglycan biosynthetic process; heparan sulfate proteoglycan biosynthetic process
Sources:Amigo / QuickGO
Orthologs
Databases	NCBI: entry; OMA: entry
Species	Human	Mouse
Entrez	9955	15478
Ensembl	ENSG00000153976	ENSMUSG00000047759
UniProt	Q9Y663	Q8BKN6
RefSeq (mRNA)	NM_006042	NM_178870
RefSeq (protein)	NP_006033	NP_849201
Location (UCSC)	Chr 17: 13.49 – 13.6 Mb	Chr 11: 64.33 – 64.41 Mb
PubMed search
- Wikidata
View/Edit Human	View/Edit Mouse

Heparan sulfate glucosamine 3-O-sulfotransferase 3A1 is an enzyme that in humans is encoded by the HS3ST3A1 gene.

Heparan sulfate biosynthetic enzymes are key components in generating myriad distinct heparan sulfate fine structures that carry out multiple biologic activities. The enzyme encoded by this gene is a member of the heparan sulfate biosynthetic enzyme family.

It is a type II integral membrane protein and possesses heparan sulfate glucosaminyl 3-O-sulfotransferase activity. The sulfotransferase domain of this enzyme is highly similar to the same domain of heparan sulfate D-glucosaminyl 3-O-sulfotransferase 3A1, and these two enzymes sulfate an identical disaccharide. This gene is widely expressed, with the most abundant expression in the liver and placenta.
