= Proteoglycan =

Class of compounds

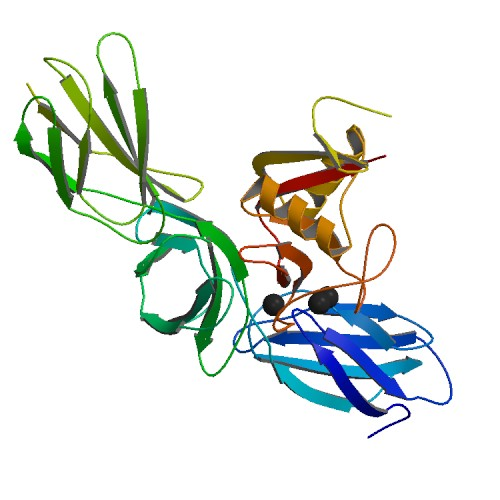
Aggrecan, the major proteoglycan in cartilage, has 2316 amino acids

Proteoglycans are proteins that are heavily glycosylated. The basic proteoglycan unit consists of a "core protein" with one or more covalently attached glycosaminoglycan (GAG) chain(s). The point of attachment is a serine (Ser) residue to which the glycosaminoglycan is joined through a tetrasaccharide bridge (e.g. chondroitin sulfate-GlcA-Gal-Gal-Xyl-PROTEIN). The Ser residue is generally in the sequence -Ser-Gly-X-Gly- (where X can be any amino acid residue but proline), although not every protein with this sequence has an attached glycosaminoglycan. The chains are long, linear carbohydrate polymers that are negatively charged under physiological conditions due to the occurrence of sulfate and uronic acid groups. Proteoglycans occur in connective tissue.

== Types ==
Proteoglycans are categorized by their relative size (large and small) and the nature of their glycosaminoglycan chains. Types include:

Type	Glycosaminoglycans (GAGs)	Small proteoglycans	Large proteoglycans
	chondroitin sulfate/dermatan sulfate	decorin, 36 kDa biglycan, 38 kDa	aggrecan, 220 kDa, the major proteoglycan in cartilage
Heparan sulfate proteoglycan (HSPGs)	heparan sulfate/chondroitin sulfate	testican, 44 kDa	perlecan, 400–470 kDa betaglycan, >300 kDa agrin, >500 kDa
Chondroitin sulfate proteoglycan (CSPGs)	chondroitin sulfate	bikunin, 25 kDa	neurocan, 136 kDa versican, 260–370 kDa, present in many adult tissues including blood vessels and skin brevican, 145kDa
Keratan sulfate proteoglycan	keratan sulfate	fibromodulin, 42 kDa lumican, 38 kDa	

Certain members are considered members of the "small leucine-rich proteoglycan family" (SLRP). These include decorin, biglycan, fibromodulin and lumican.

== Function ==
Proteoglycans are a major component of the animal extracellular matrix, the "filler" substance existing between cells in an organism. Here they form large complexes, both to other proteoglycans, to hyaluronan, and to fibrous matrix proteins, such as collagen. The combination of proteoglycans and collagen form cartilage, a sturdy tissue that is usually heavily hydrated (mostly due to the negatively charged sulfates in the glycosaminoglycan chains of the proteoglycans). They are also involved in binding cations (such as sodium, potassium and calcium) and water, and also regulating the movement of molecules through the matrix. Evidence also shows they can affect the activity and stability of proteins and signalling molecules within the matrix. Individual functions of proteoglycans can be attributed to either the protein core or the attached GAG chain. They can also serve as lubricants, by creating a hydrating gel that helps withstand high pressure.

== Synthesis ==
The protein component of proteoglycans is synthesized by ribosomes and translocated into the lumen of the rough endoplasmic reticulum. Glycosylation of the proteoglycan occurs in the Golgi apparatus in multiple enzymatic steps. First, a special link tetrasaccharide is attached to a serine side chain on the core protein to serve as a primer for polysaccharide growth. Then sugars are added one at a time by glycosyl transferase. The completed proteoglycan is then exported in secretory vesicles to the extracellular matrix of the tissue.

== Clinical significance ==
An inability to break down the proteoglycans is characteristic of a group of genetic disorders, called mucopolysaccharidoses. The inactivity of specific lysosomal enzymes that normally degrade glycosaminoglycans leads to the accumulation of proteoglycans within cells. This leads to a variety of disease symptoms, depending upon the type of proteoglycan that is not degraded. Mutations in the gene encoding the galactosyltransferase B4GALT7 result in a reduced substitution of the proteoglycans decorin and biglycan with glycosaminoglycan chains, and cause a spondylodysplastic form of Ehlers–Danlos syndrome.

== Distinction between proteoglycans and glycoproteins ==
Quoting from recommendations for IUPAC:

A glycoprotein is a compound containing carbohydrate (or glycan) covalently linked to protein. The carbohydrate may be in the form of a monosaccharide, disaccharide(s), oligosaccharide(s), polysaccharide(s), or their derivatives (e.g. sulfo- or phospho-substituted). One, a few, or many carbohydrate units may be present. Proteoglycans are a subclass of glycoproteins in which the carbohydrate units are polysaccharides that contain amino sugars. Such polysaccharides are also known as glycosaminoglycans.
