= Chondroitin sulfate =

Sulfated glycosaminoglycan (GAG) compound

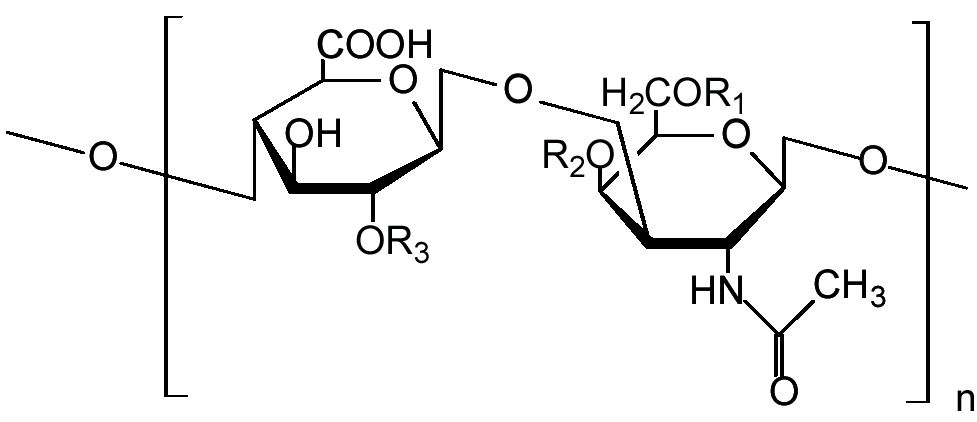
Chemical structure of one unit in a chondroitin sulfate chain. Chondroitin-4-sulfate: R_{1} = H; R_{2} = SO_{3}H; R_{3} = H. Chondroitin-6-sulfate: R_{1} = SO_{3}H; R_{2}, R_{3} = H.

Chondroitin sulfate is a sulfated glycosaminoglycan (GAG) composed of a chain of alternating sugars (N-acetylgalactosamine and glucuronic acid). It is usually found attached to proteins as part of a proteoglycan. A chondroitin chain can have over 100 individual sugars, each of which can be sulfated in variable positions and quantities. Chondroitin sulfate is an important structural component of cartilage, and provides much of its resistance to compression. Along with glucosamine, chondroitin sulfate has become a widely used dietary supplement for treatment of osteoarthritis, although large clinical trials failed to demonstrate any symptomatic benefit of chondroitin. Fragments of chondroitin chains suspended in water elicit a fear response in many fishes, similar to hypoxanthine-3N-oxide. The basic repeat unit synthesised by the CHSY/CHPF heterocomplex is (GlcAβ1,3GlcNAcβ1,4)n.

== Medical use ==
Chondroitin is used in dietary supplements as an alternative medicine to treat osteoarthritis. It is also approved and regulated as a symptomatic slow-acting drug for this disease (SYSADOA) in Europe and some other countries. It is commonly sold together with glucosamine. A 2015 Cochrane review of clinical trials found that most were of low quality, but that there was some evidence of short-term improvement in pain and few side effects; it does not appear to improve or maintain the health of affected joints.

Chondroitin, along with commonly used glucosamine, should not be used to treat people who have symptomatic osteoarthritis of the knee as evidence shows that these treatments fail to provide relief for that condition. However, more recent studies suggest that these substances, particularly when used in combination with other components such as collagen, may provide symptomatic benefits in knee osteoarthritis.

Chondroitin has shown to be promising in the treatment of coronary artery disease. In a 6-year double-blind placebo-controlled study involving 60 test subjects published in 1973, the chondroitin sulfate group showed a 350% reduction in fatal heart attacks compared to the control group. When analyzing the data for non-fatal cardiovascular events, the control group experienced non-fatal heart attacks at a rate of 16%, while those in the chondroitin sulfate-treated group came in at 0%.

Chondroitin sulfate is used as a dietary supplement for diabetes management. It exhibits anti-inflammatory properties, making it a potential alternative to cortisol for treating enteritis.

== Adverse effects ==
Clinical studies have not identified any significant side effects or overdoses of chondroitin sulfate, which suggest its long-term safety. In 2003 the Task Force of the European League Against Rheumatism (EULAR) committee ranked the level of toxicity of chondroitin sulfate 6 in a 0–100 scale.

Chondroitin sulfate is not metabolized by cytochrome P450.

== Pharmacology ==
=== Mechanisms of action ===
The effect of chondroitin sulfate in people with osteoarthritis is likely the result of a number of reactions including its anti-inflammatory activity, the stimulation of the synthesis of proteoglycans and hyaluronic acid, and the decrease in catabolic activity of chondrocytes, inhibiting the synthesis of proteolytic enzymes, nitric oxide, and other substances that contribute to damage the cartilage matrix and cause death of articular chondrocytes. A recent review summarizes data from relevant reports describing the biochemical basis of the effect of chondroitin sulfate on osteoarthritis articular tissues.

=== Bioavailability and pharmacokinetics ===
Pharmacokinetic studies performed on humans and experimental animals after oral administration of chondroitin sulfate revealed that it can be absorbed orally. Chondroitin sulfate shows first-order kinetics up to single doses of 3,000 mg. Multiple doses of 800 mg in people with osteoarthritis do not alter the kinetics of chondroitin sulfate. The bioavailability of chondroitin sulfate ranges from 15% to 24% of the orally administered dose. More particularly, on the articular tissue, Ronca et al. reported that chondroitin sulfate is not rapidly absorbed in the gastro-intestinal tract and a high content of labeled chondroitin sulfate is found in the synovial fluid and cartilage.

== Physical and chemical properties ==
Chondroitin sulfate chains are unbranched polysaccharides of variable length containing two alternating monosaccharides: D-glucuronic acid (GlcA) and N-acetyl-D-galactosamine (GalNAc). Some of these GlcA residues may be epimerized into L-iduronic acid (IdoA) at which point the resulting glycosaminoglycan is then referred to as dermatan sulfate, previously referred to as chondroitin sulfate B.

Chondroitin sulfate is sourced from natural products, with high variability in terms of chain length and sulfation pattern. The variability in chondroitin sulfate composition extends to its origin, making it possible to differentiate between chondroitin sulfate from terrestrial and marine sources. One way to look at this difference is in terms of the proportion of disaccharide units: chondroitin sulfate from terrestrial animals is almost exclusively composed of non-sulfated (O) and monosulfated (A and C) units, while in marine species the proportion of disulfated (D, E and B) units is higher. Furthermore, marine chondroitin sulfate chains tend to be longer, with molecular weight of up to 70 kDa in chondroitin sulfate from shark, while in terrestrial animals molecular weight is typically below 45 kDa.

Chondroitin sulfate chains are linked to hydroxyl groups on serine residues of certain proteins. Exactly how proteins are selected for attachment of glycosaminoglycans is not understood. Glycosylated serines are often followed by a glycine and have neighboring acidic residues, but this motif does not always predict glycosylation.

Attachment of the GAG chain begins with four monosaccharides in a fixed pattern: Xyl – Gal – Gal – GlcA. Each sugar is attached by a specific enzyme, allowing for multiple levels of control over GAG synthesis. Xylose begins to be attached to proteins in the endoplasmic reticulum, while the rest of the sugars are attached in the Golgi apparatus.

Chondroitin sulfate is highly soluble in water.

== History ==
Chondroitin sulfate was originally isolated well before the structure was characterised, leading to changes in terminology with time. Early researchers identified different fractions of the substance with letters.

Letter identification	Site of sulfation	Systematic name
Chondroitin sulfate A	carbon 4 of the N-acetylgalactosamine (GalNAc) sugar	chondroitin-4-sulfate
Chondroitin sulfate C	carbon 6 of the GalNAc sugar	chondroitin-6-sulfate
Chondroitin sulfate D	carbon 2 of the glucuronic acid and 6 of the GalNAc sugar	chondroitin-2,6-sulfate
Chondroitin sulfate E	carbons 4 and 6 of the GalNAc sugar	chondroitin-4,6-sulfate

"Chondroitin sulfate B" is an old name for dermatan sulfate, and it is no longer classified as a form of chondroitin sulfate.

Chondroitin, without the "sulfate", has been used to describe a fraction with little or no sulfation. However, this distinction is not used by all.

Although the name "chondroitin sulfate" suggests a salt with a sulfate counter-anion, this is not the case, as sulfate is covalently bonded to the sugar. Rather, since the molecule has multiple negative charges at physiological pH, a cation is present in salts of chondroitin sulfate. Commercial preparations of chondroitin sulfate typically are the sodium salt. Barnhill et al. have suggested that all such preparations of chondroitin sulfate be referred to as "sodium chondroitin" regardless of their sulfation status.

In 2008 the U.S. Food and Drug Administration (FDA) identified "oversulfated chondroitin sulfate" as a contaminant in heparin originating from China.

=== Clinical trials for osteoarthritis ===
In 2004, a petition was submitted to the FDA that a dietary supplement of chondroitin sulfate be labeled as reducing the risk of osteoarthritis, cartilage deterioration, and osteoarthritis-related joint pain, tenderness, and swelling. The FDA denied the request, stating that experiments conducted by the company did not sufficiently demonstrate the effectiveness of the claim. Among other comments, the FDA noted the poor experimental design of some trials.

In 2007, Reichenbach et al. used explicit methods to conduct and report a systematic review of 20 trials and concluded "large-scale, methodologically sound trials indicate that the symptomatic benefit of chondroitin is minimal or nonexistent. Use of chondroitin in routine clinical practice should therefore be discouraged." In contrast, and also in 2007, Bruyere et al. concluded that "there is compelling evidence that glucosamine sulfate and chondroitin sulfate may interfere with progression of OA."

As of 2015 the largest trial conducted with the product was the Glucosamine and Chondroitin Arthritis Intervention Trial (GAIT), a double-blind, randomized, multicenter clinical trial sponsored by the US National Institutes of Health in 1583 people with knee osteoarthritis, which was published in the New England Journal of Medicine in 2006. Subjects were randomly assigned to one of five orally administered treatments: two 250 mg capsules of glucosamine hydrochloride three times daily, two 200 mg capsules of chondroitin sulfate three times daily, two capsules of 250 mg of glucosamine hydrochloride plus 200 mg of chondroitin sulfate three times daily, 200 mg of celecoxib daily, or placebo. Treatment was administered for 24 weeks. It showed no difference from placebo.

Sawitzke A, et al. 2010 evaluated the efficacy and safety of glucosamine and chondroitin sulfate, alone or in combination, as well as celecoxib and placebo on painful knee osteoarthritis over 2 years as a continuation of the GAIT trial. This was a 24-month, double-blind, placebo-controlled study, enrolling 662 people with knee osteoarthritis who satisfied radiographic criteria (Kellgren/Lawrence grade 2 or 3 changes and baseline joint space width of at least 2 mm). This subset continued to receive their randomized treatment (glucosamine 500 mg three times daily, chondroitin sulfate 400 mg three times daily, the combination of glucosamine and chondroitin sulfate, celecoxib 200 mg daily, or placebo) over 24 months. The primary outcome was a 20% reduction in pain over 24 months as measured by the Western Ontario and McMaster University Osteoarthritis Index (WOMAC). Secondary outcomes included an Outcome Measures in Rheumatology/Osteoarthritis Research Society International response and change from baseline in WOMAC pain and function. Over 2 years, none of the treatments (not even the positive control celecoxib) achieved a clinically important difference in WOMAC pain or function as compared with placebo. Adverse reactions were similar among treatment groups and serious adverse events were rare for all treatments.

=== Research ===
A 2021 study showed a remarkable (about 40%) reduction of the acute myocardial infarction risk in current chondroitin sulfate users in the high risk cardiovascular subgroups.

== Society and culture ==
=== Manufacture ===
Most chondroitin appears to be made from extracts of cartilaginous cow and pig tissues (cow trachea and pig ear and nose), but other sources such as shark, fish, and bird cartilage are also used. Since chondroitin is not a uniform substance, and is naturally present in a wide variety of forms, the precise composition of each supplement will vary. In fact, although many food supplement companies produce their products in compliance with human food processing Good Manufacturing Practice (GMP), most of them do not produce their products in compliance with the GMP regulations for pharmaceuticals, resulting in products not meeting pharmaceutical requirements.

=== Legal status ===
While it is a prescription or over-the-counter drug in 22 countries, chondroitin is regulated in the U.S. as a dietary supplement by the Food and Drug Administration. In Europe, chondroitin sulfate formulations are approved as drugs with evidenced efficacy and safety demonstrated by clinical trials in people with osteoarthritis. Adebowale et al. reported in 2000 that of 32 chondroitin supplements they analysed, only 5 were labeled correctly, and more than half contained less than 40% of the labeled amount. With the introduction of GMP regulations for dietary supplements in 2008, chondroitin sulfate preparations are subject in the US to mandatory labeling standards as well as testing requirements for identity, purity, strength, and composition. United States Pharmacopoeia (USP) testing standards for the identification and quantification of chondroitin are well-established.

There are no FDA regulations on chondroitin sulfate as a food additive, as it is recognized by the FDA as a component of food and is "generally recognized as safe". However, a proposed application of chondroitin sulfate dietary supplement as a means of preventing joint degeneration was highly scrutinized by the FDA, who stated:

" For conventional foods, this evaluation involves considering whether the ingredient that is the source of the substance is generally recognized as safe (GRAS), approved as a food additive, or authorized by a prior sanction issued by FDA (see 21 CFR 101.70(f)). Dietary ingredients in dietary supplements, however, are not subject to the food additive provisions of the act (see section 201(s)(6) of the Act (21 U.S.C. § 321(s)(6)). Rather, they are subject to the adulteration provisions in section 402 of the Act (21 U.S.C. 342) and, if applicable, the new dietary ingredient provisions in section 413 of the Act (21 U.S.C. 350b), which pertain to dietary ingredients that were not marketed in the United States before October 15, 1994."

— Letter Regarding the Relationship Between the Consumption of Glucosamine and/or Chondroitin Sulfate and a Reduced Risk of: Osteoarthritis; Osteoarthritis-related Joint Pain, Joint Tenderness, and Joint Swelling; Joint Degeneration; and Cartilage Deterioration

In the same letter, the FDA found that studies performed on the dietary supplement form of chondroitin sulfate were insufficient to substantiate claims that it is efficacious in the prevention of joint deterioration, and denied the request to be allowed to label the supplement as such. They further denied the request to market it as safe, given that no human clinical trials were done, citing that animal studies are not sufficient for the approval of a dietary supplement.

== Veterinary use ==
Chondroitin and glucosamine are also used in veterinary medicine for osteoarthritis.

== See also ==
- Proteoglycan
- Heparin sulfate – a glycosaminoglycan of major pharmaceutical importance for many decades
- Heparan sulfate – a glycosaminoglycan component of proteoglycans in a wide range of vertebrate & invertebrate life
- Methylsulfonylmethane
