= Xylose =

Sugar

d-Xylose
- Haworth projection of alpha-D-xylopyranose

D-Xylopyranose
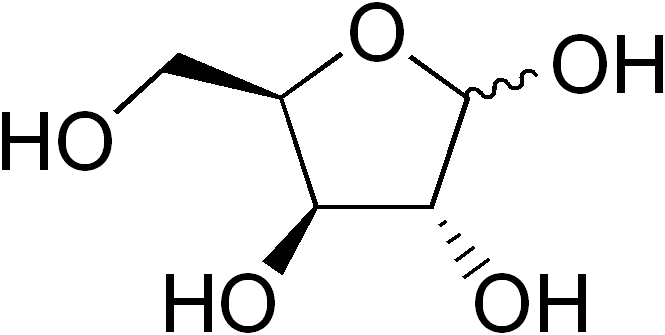
Xylofuranose
- Xylose chair

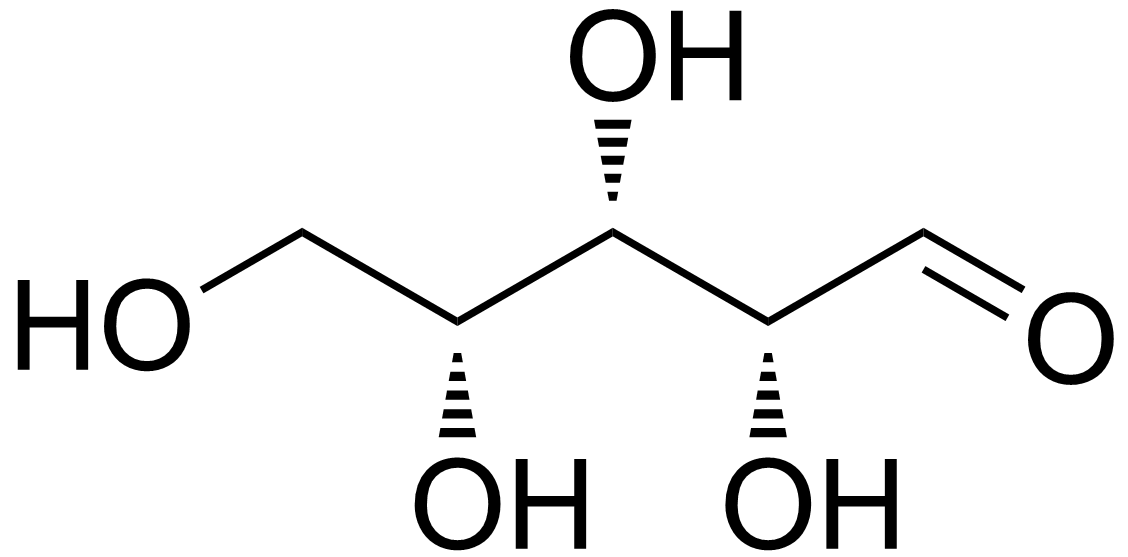
- Xylose linear

Names
- IUPAC name d-Xylose
- Systematic IUPAC name d-xylo-Pentose
- Other names (+)-Xylose; Wood sugar

Identifiers
CAS Number	58-86-6; 609-06-3 (l-isomer); 41247-05-6 (racemate)
3D model (JSmol)	Interactive image
ChEMBL	ChEMBL502135
ChemSpider	119104
ECHA InfoCard	100.043.072
EC Number	200-400-7
PubChem CID	135191
UNII	A1TA934AKO; A4JW0V2MYA (l-isomer)
- InChI: InChI=1S/C5H10O5/c6-2-1-10-5(9)4(8)3(2)7/h2-9H,1H2/t2-,3+,4-,5?/m1/s1 Key: SRBFZHDQGSBBOR-IOVATXLUSA-N; InChI=1/C5H10O5/c6-2-1-10-5(9)4(8)3(2)7/h2-9H,1H2/t2-,3+,4-,5?/m1/s1 Key: SRBFZHDQGSBBOR-IOVATXLUBL
- SMILES: C1[C@H]([C@@H]([C@H](C(O1)O)O)O)O

Properties
Chemical formula	C_{5}H_{10}O_{5}
Molar mass	150.13 g/mol
Appearance	monoclinic needles or prisms, colourless
Density	1.525 g/cm^{3} (20 °C)
Melting point	144 to 145 °C (291 to 293 °F; 417 to 418 K)
Chiral rotation ([α]_{D})	+22.5° (CHCl_{3})
Magnetic susceptibility (χ)	−84.80·10^{−6} cm^{3}/mol

Hazards
NFPA 704 (fire diamond)	1 1 0

Related compounds
Related aldopentoses	Arabinose; Ribose; Lyxose
Related compounds	Xylulose
- Except where otherwise noted, data are given for materials in their standard state (at 25 °C [77 °F], 100 kPa). verify (what is ?) Infobox references

Xylose (cf. Ancient Greek: ξύλον, xylon, "wood") is a common monosaccharide, i.e. a simple sugar. Xylose is classified as aldopentose type, which means that it contains five carbon atoms and includes an aldehyde functional group, at least in its open-chain form. It is abundant in biomass, and is one of the most abundant sugars in nature. It is a white, water-soluble solid.

== Structure ==
The acyclic form of xylose has chemical formula HOCH_{2}(CH(OH))3CHO. Cyclic hemiacetal isomers are more prevalent in solution. These cyclic isomers include the pyranoses feature six-membered C_{5}O rings, and the furanoses, which feature five-membered C_{4}O rings (with a pendant CH_{2}OH group). Each of these rings is subject to further isomerism, depending on the relative orientation of the anomeric hydroxy group.

The dextrorotary form, d-xylose, is the one that usually occurs endogenously in living things. A levorotary form, l-xylose, can be synthesized.

== Occurrence ==
Xylose is the main building block for the hemicellulose xylan, which comprises about 30% of some plants (birch for example), far less in others (spruce and pine have about 9% xylan). Xylose is otherwise pervasive, being found in the embryos of most edible plants. It was first isolated from wood by Finnish scientist, Koch, in 1881, but first became commercially viable, with a price close to sucrose, in 1930.

Xylose is also the first saccharide added to the serine or threonine in the proteoglycan type O-glycosylation, and, so, it is the first saccharide in biosynthetic pathways of most anionic polysaccharides such as heparan sulfate and chondroitin sulfate.

Xylose is also found in some species of Chrysolinina beetles, including Chrysolina coerulans. They have cardiac glycosides (including xylose) in their defensive glands.

== Applications ==
=== Chemicals ===
The acid-catalysed degradation of hemicellulose gives furfural, a precursor to synthetic polymers and to tetrahydrofuran.

=== Human consumption ===
Xylose is not a major human nutrient and is largely excreted by the kidneys. An oxidoreductase pathway is present in eukaryotic microorganisms. Humans have enzymes called protein xylosyltransferases (XYLT1, XYLT2) which transfer xylose from UDP to a serine in the core protein of proteoglycans.

=== Animal medicine ===
In animal medicine, xylose is used to test for malabsorption by administration in water to the patient after fasting. If xylose is detected in blood and/or urine within the next few hours, it has been absorbed by the intestines.

High xylose intake on the order of approximately 100 g/kg of animal body weight is relatively well tolerated in pigs, and in a similar manner to results from human studies, a portion of the xylose ingested is excreted in urine unmodified.

=== Derivatives ===
Reduction of xylose by catalytic hydrogenation produces the sugar alcohol xylitol, which provides about 2.4 calories per gram, and is used as a sweetener.

== See also ==
- Saccharophagus degradans
- Xylonic acid
- Xylose metabolism
- Xylitol
