= Abondance =

Abondance may refer to:

- Abondance cheese, a type of cheese
- Abondance (cattle), a breed of cattle
- Abondance, Haute-Savoie, a commune of the Haute-Savoie département in France
- Abondance Ski Valley, a ski area in the Portes du Soleil, France
- Abondance (ship), a French Navy vessel captured and taken into Royal Navy service as HMS Abondance

== See also ==
- Abundance (disambiguation)
