= Abundance =

Abundance may refer to:

== Economics ==
In economics, abundance is the opposite of scarcity, in the technical sense of having finite goods and services that need to be allocated.

- Post-scarcity means as much is produced as is wanted, so no exclusionary allocations are needed
- The Abundance Movement is also known as supply-side progressivism
  - Abundance (Klein and Thompson book), a landmark 2025 book in the movement

== Math ==
- Abundance, the defining characteristic of abundant numbers

== Biology ==
- Abundance (ecology), the relative representation of a species in a community

== Chemistry ==
- Abundance (chemistry), when a substance in a reaction is present in high quantities
- Abundance of the chemical elements, a measure of how common elements are
  - Isotopic abundance, the natural prevalence of different isotopes of an element on Earth
  - Abundance of elements in Earth's crust

== In literature ==
- Al-Kawthar ("Abundance"), the 108th sura of the Qur'an
- Abundance (play), a 1990 stage play written by Beth Henley
- Abundance: The Future Is Better Than You Think, a 2012 book by Peter Diamandis and Steven Kotler
- Abundance (novel), a 2021 novel by Jakob Guanzon

== Other uses ==
- Abundance Agenda, a policy platform in US politics
- Abundance Generation, a renewable energy investment platform
- Fountain de la Abundancia, a former fountain in Madrid
- Abundance, Royal Abundance and Abundance Declared, bids in the card game Solo whist; sometimes spelled "abondance"

== See also ==
- Abondance (disambiguation)
- Abundant life (disambiguation)
- Abundantia, a Roman goddess
