= Carbohydrate sulfotransferase =

Enzymes which transfer a sulfate group

Carbohydrate Sulfotransferase family 2
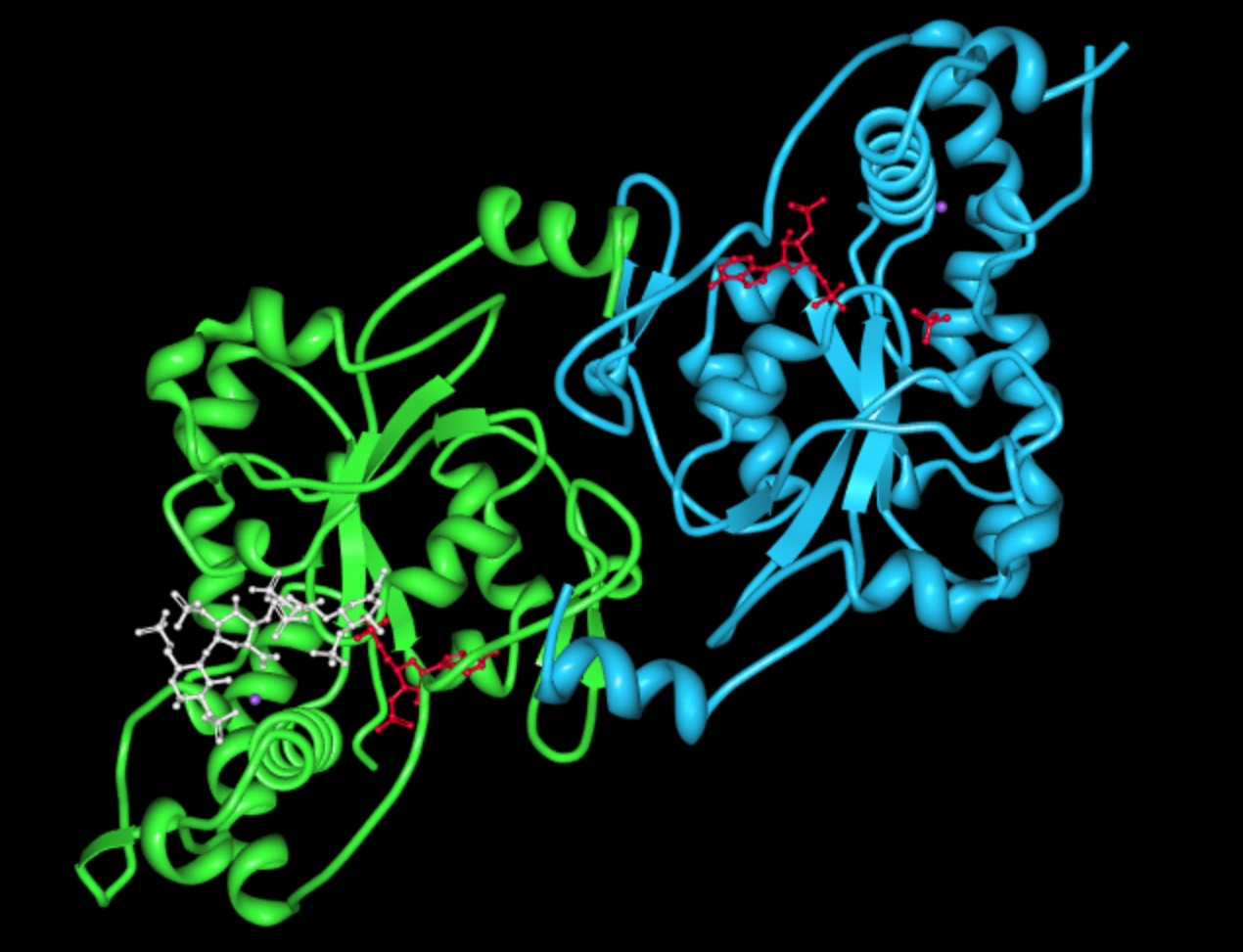
- Example carbohydrate sulfotransferase with PAPS cosubstrate and carbohydrate substrate: Crystal Structure of human 3-O-Sulfotransferase-3 with bound PAPS and tetrasaccharide substrate. Enzyme chain A (blue), Enzyme chain B (green), PAPS (red), tetrasaccharide substrate (white), sodium ion (purple sphere).

Identifiers
- Symbol: Sulfotransfer_2
- Pfam: PF03567
- InterPro: IPR005331
- Membranome: 495
Available protein structures:
- PDB: IPR005331 PF03567 (ECOD; PDBsum)
- AlphaFold: IPR005331; PF03567

Carbohydrate Sulfotransferase family 1

Identifiers
- Symbol: Sulfotransfer_1
- InterPro: IPR016469
- Membranome: 493
Available protein structures:
- PDB: IPR016469
- AlphaFold: IPR016469

In biochemistry, carbohydrate sulfotransferases are enzymes within the class of sulfotransferases which catalyze the transfer of the sulfate (−SO^{−}_{3}) functional group to carbohydrate groups in glycoproteins and glycolipids. Carbohydrates are used by cells for a wide range of functions from structural purposes to extracellular communication. Carbohydrates are suitable for such a wide variety of functions due to the diversity in structure generated from monosaccharide composition, glycosidic linkage positions, chain branching, and covalent modification. Possible covalent modifications include acetylation, methylation, phosphorylation, and sulfation. Sulfation, performed by carbohydrate sulfotransferases, generates carbohydrate sulfate esters (−O−SO^{−}_{3}). These sulfate esters are only located extracellularly, whether through excretion into the extracellular matrix (ECM) or by presentation on the cell surface. As extracellular compounds, sulfated carbohydrates are mediators of intercellular communication, cellular adhesion, and ECM maintenance.

== Enzyme mechanism ==
Sulfotransferases catalyze the transfer of a sulfonyl group from an activated sulfate donor onto a hydroxyl group (or an amino group, although this is less common) of an acceptor molecule. In eukaryotic cells the activated sulfate donor is 3'-phosphoadenosine-5'-phosphosulfate (PAPS) (Figure 1).

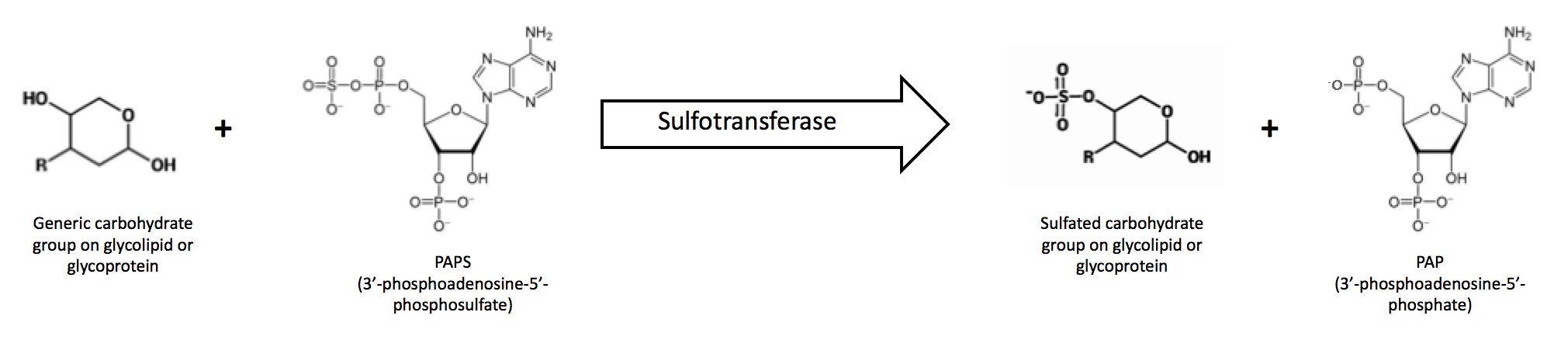
Figure 1: A general carbohydrate sulfotransferase reaction. PAPS is shown as the activated sulfate donor; PAPS is the sulfate donor in eukaryotic cells.

PAPS is synthesized in the cytosol from ATP and sulfate through the sequential action of ATP sulfurylase and APS kinase. ATP sulfurylase first generates adenosine-5'-phosphosulfate (APS) and then APS kinase transfers a phosphate from ATP to APS to create PAPS. The importance of PAPS and sulfation has been discerned in previous studies by using chlorate, an analogue of sulfate, as a competitive inhibitor of ATP sulfurylase. PAPS is a cosubstrate and source of activated sulfate for both cytosolic sulfotransferases and carbohydrate sulfotransferases, which are located in the Golgi. PAPS moves between the cytosol and the Golgi lumen via PAPS/PAP (3’-phosphoadenosine-5’-phosphate) translocase, a transmembrane antiporter.

The exact mechanism used by sulfotransferases is still being elucidated, but studies have indicated that sulfotransferases use an in-line sulfonyl-transfer mechanism that is analogous to the phosphoryl transfer mechanism used by many kinases, which is logical given the great level of structural and functional similarities between kinases and sulfotransferases (Figure 2). In carbohydrate sulfotransferases a conserved lysine has been identified in the active PAPS binding site, which is analogous to a conserved lysine in the active ATP binding site of kinases. Protein sequence alignment studies indicate that this lysine is conserved in cytosolic sulfotransferases as well.

In addition to the conserved lysine, sulfotransferases have a highly conserved histidine in the active site. Based on the conservation of these residues, theoretical models, and experimental measurements a theoretical transition state for catalyzed sulfation has been proposed (Figure 3).

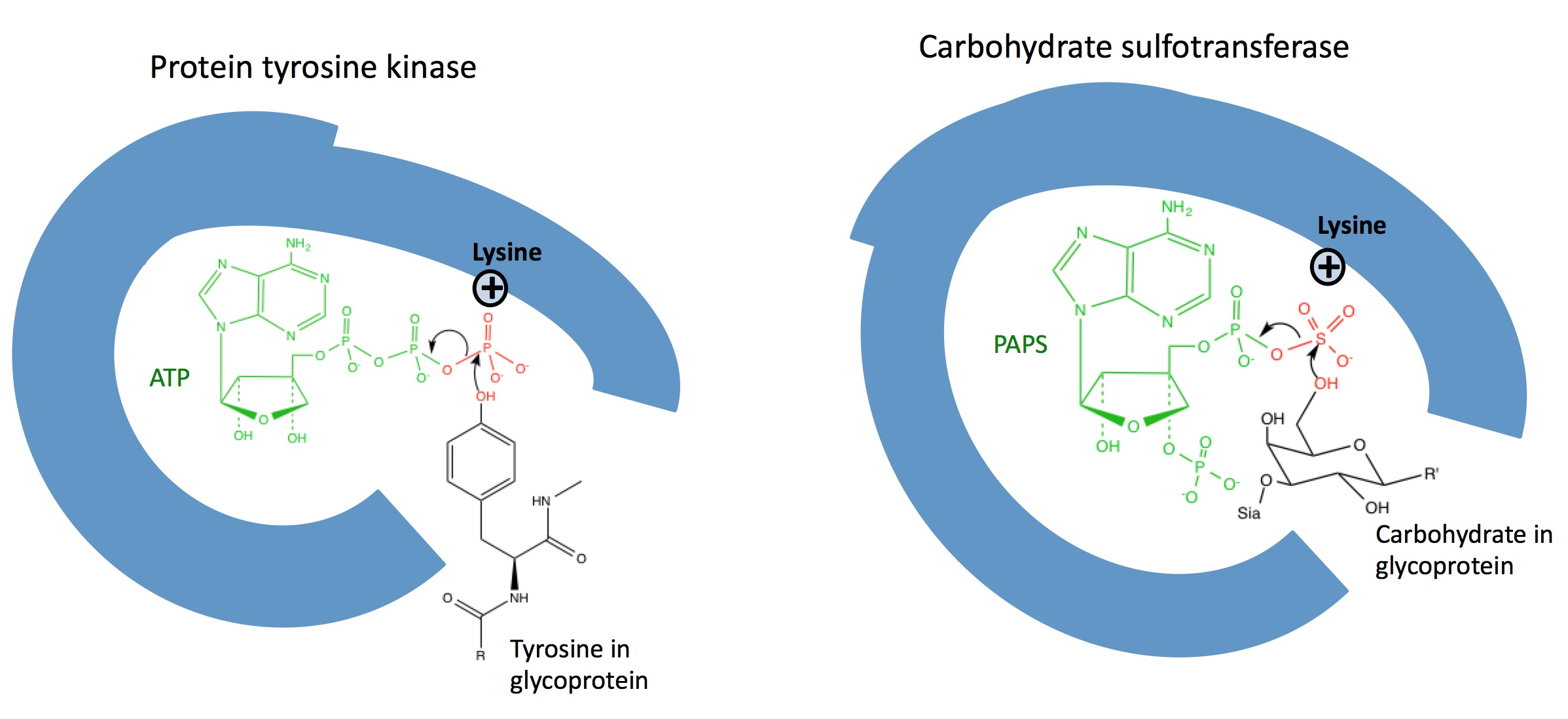
Figure 2: The mechanism by which carbohydrate sulfotransferase catalyzes the transfer of a sulfonyl group to a carbohydrate group in a glycoprotein or glycolipid is analogous to the mechanism by which a kinase catalyzes a phosphoryl group. Both enzymes use a lysine residue in their active sites to coordinate to their cosubstrates; the ATP cosubstrate in the kinase mechanism is analogous to the PAPS in the carbohydrate sulfotransferase mechanism (green). Red shows the group being transferred; note that the transfer is coordinated around the lysine. Black is the substrate. Sia stands for sialic acid.

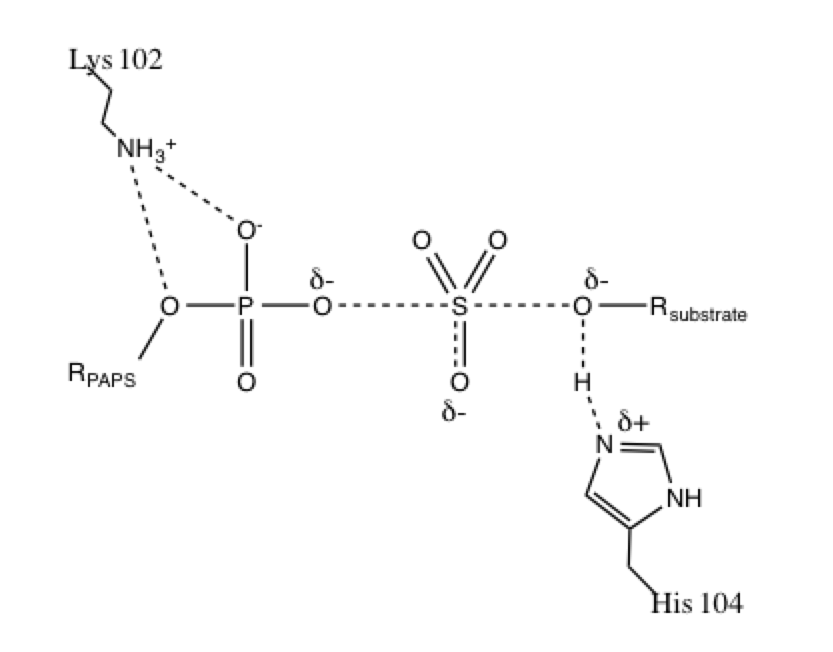
Figure 3: Transition state for catalyzed sulfation as proposed by Chapman et al. 2004. Note the use of the conserved lysine and histidine residues.

== Biological function ==
Carbohydrate sulfotransferases are transmembrane enzymes in the Golgi that modify carbohydrates on glycolipids or glycoproteins as they move along the secretory pathway. They have a short cytoplasmic N-terminal, one transmembrane domain, and a large C-terminal Golgi luminal domain. They are distinct from cytosolic sulfotransferases in both structure and function. While cytosolic sulfotransferases play a metabolic role by modifying small molecule substrates such as steroids, flavonoids, neurotransmitters, and phenols, carbohydrate sulfotransferases have a fundamental role in extracellular signalling and adhesion by generating unique ligands through the modification of carbohydrate scaffolds. Since the substrates of carbohydrate sulfotransferases are larger, they have larger active sites than cytosolic sulfotransferases.

There are two major families of carbohydrate sulfotransferases: heparan sulfotransferases and galactose/N-acetylgalactosamine/N-acetylglucosamine 6-O-sulfotransferases (GSTs).

=== Heparan Sulfotransferases ===
Heparan sulfate is a glycosaminoglycan (GAG) that is linked by xylose to serine residues of proteins such as perlecan, syndecan, or glypican. Sulfation of heparan sulfate GAGs helps give diversity to cell surface proteins and provides them with a unique sulfation pattern that allows them to specifically interact with other proteins. For example, in mast cells the AT-III-binding pentasaccharide is synthesized with essential heparan sulfate sulfation steps. The binding of the heparan sulfate in this pentasaccharide to AT-III inactivates the blood-coagulation factors thrombin and Factor Xa. Heparan sulfates are also known to interact with growth factors, cytokines, chemokines, lipid and membrane binding proteins, and adhesion molecules.

=== GSTs ===
GSTs catalyze sulfation at the 6-hydroxyl group of galactose, N-acetylgalactosamine, or N-acetylglucosamine. Like heparan sulfotransferases, GSTs are responsible for post-translational protein sulfation that assists in cell-signaling. GSTs are also responsible for the sulfation of extracellular matrix (ECM) proteins that assist with maintaining the structure between cells For example, GSTs catalyze the sulfation of glycoproteins displaying the L-selectin binding epitope 6-sulfo sialyl Lewis x, which recruits leukocytes to areas of chronic inflammation. GSTs are also responsible for the proper function of the ECM in the cornea; improper sulfation by GSTs can lead to opaque corneas.

== Disease Relevance ==
Carbohydrate sulfotransferases are of great interest as drug targets because of their essential roles in cell-cell signalling, adhesion, and ECM maintenance. Their roles in blood coagulation, chronic inflammation, and cornea maintenance mentioned in the Biological Function section above are all of interest for potential therapeutic purposes. In addition to these roles, carbohydrate sulfotransferases are of pharmacological interest because of their roles in viral infection, including herpes simplex virus 1 (HSV-1) and human immunodeficiency virus 1 (HIV-1). Heparan sulfate sites have been shown to be essential for HSV-1 binding that leads to the virus entering the cell. In contrast, heparan sulfate complexes have been shown to bind to HIV-1 and prevent it from entering the cell through its intended target, the CD4 receptor.

Mutation in Carbohydrate sulfotransferases 6 (CHST6) is associated with Macular Corneal Dystrophy (MCD) Inheritance: Autosomal recessive. Genetic Locus: 16q22 Online Mendelian Inheritance in man (OMIM) Entry OMIM #217800

== Human proteins from this family ==
- Carbohydrate sulfotransferases 6 (CHST6) Sulfotransferase that utilizes 3'-phospho-5'-adenylyl sulfate (PAPS) as sulfonate donor to catalyze the transfer of sulfate to position 6 of non-reducing N-acetylglucosamine (GlcNAc) residues of keratan. Mediates sulfation of keratan in cornea. Keratan sulfate plays a central role in maintaining corneal transparency.
- Carbohydrate sulfotransferases 8 (CHST8) and 9 (CHST9), which transfer sulfate to position 4 of non-reducing N-acetylgalactosamine (GalNAc) residues in both N-glycans and O-glycans. They function in the biosynthesis of glycoprotein hormones lutropin and thyrotropin, by mediating sulfation of their carbohydrate structures.
- Carbohydrate sulfotransferase 10 (CHST10), which transfers sulfate to position 3 of the terminal glucuronic acid in both protein- and lipid-linked oligosaccharides. It directs the biosynthesis of the HNK-1 carbohydrate structure, a sulfated glucuronyl-lactosaminyl residue carried by many neural recognition molecules, which is involved in cell interactions during ontogenetic development and in synaptic plasticity in the adult.
- Carbohydrate sulfotransferases 11 - 13 (CHST11, CHST12, CHST13), which catalyze the transfer of sulfate to position 4 of the GalNAc residue of chondroitin. Chondroitin sulfate constitutes the predominant proteoglycan present in cartilage and is distributed on the surfaces of many cells and extracellular matrices. Some, thought not all, of these enzymes also transfer sulfate to dermatan.
- Carbohydrate sulfotransferase D4ST1 (D4ST1), which transfers sulfate to position 4 of the GalNAc residue of dermatan sulfate.
