= Fehring (surname) =

Fehring is surname. Notable people with the surname include:

- Charlie Fehring (1899–1981), Australian rules footballer
- Dutch Fehring (1912–2006), American football and baseball player and coach
- Jeff Fehring (1955–2008), Australian rules footballer

== See also ==
- Fehr
