= Fahr =

Fahr (German pronunciation: [ˈfaːɐ̯]) is a German surname. Notable people with the surname include:

- Jerry Fahr (1924–2010), baseball player
- Julius Fahr, Canadian businessman
- Karl Theodor Fahr (1877–1945), German pathologist
- Otto Fahr (1892–1969), German swimmer
- Sarah Fahr (born 2001), Italian volleyball player

== See also ==
- Fahr (Neuwied), a village today belonging to the town of Neuwied, Germany
- Fahr bin Taimur al Said, member of the Omani royal family
- Fahr Monastery, Benedictine nunnery located in Würenlos in the Canton of Aargau, Switzerland
- Fahr's syndrome, rare, genetically dominant, inherited neurological disorder
- Deutz-Fahr, German tractor brand, today part of SAME Deutz-Fahr, traces its roots to 1894 when Deutz was founded
- SAME Deutz-Fahr (SDF), an Italian-based manufacturer of tractors, combine harvesters, other agricultural machines, engines and equipment
- Fehr
