= Peeling skin syndrome =

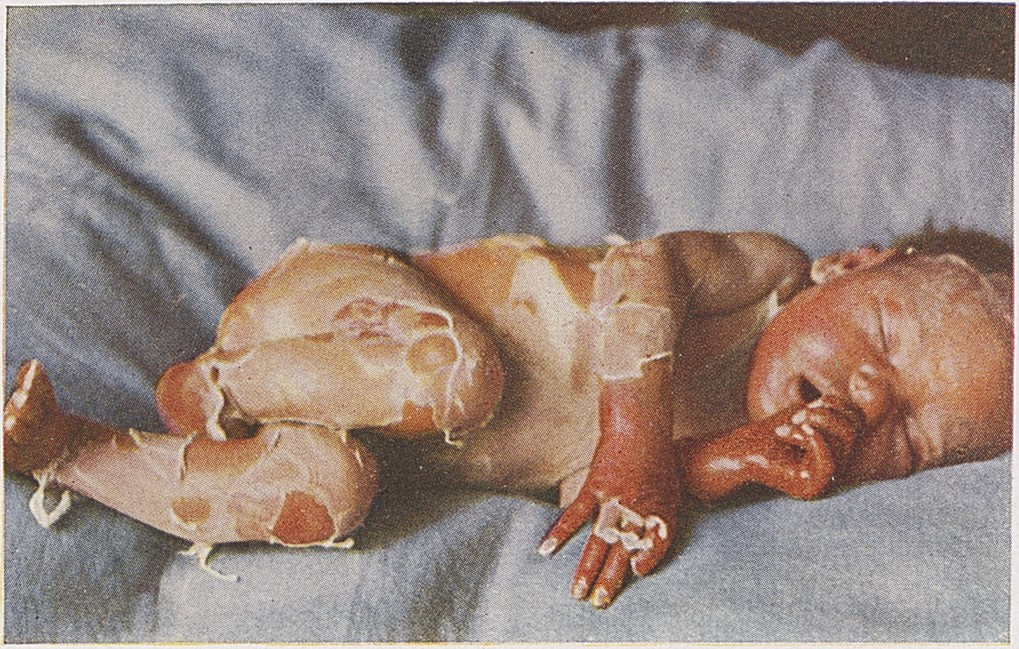
- Infant with peeling skin syndrome
- Specialty: Medical genetics

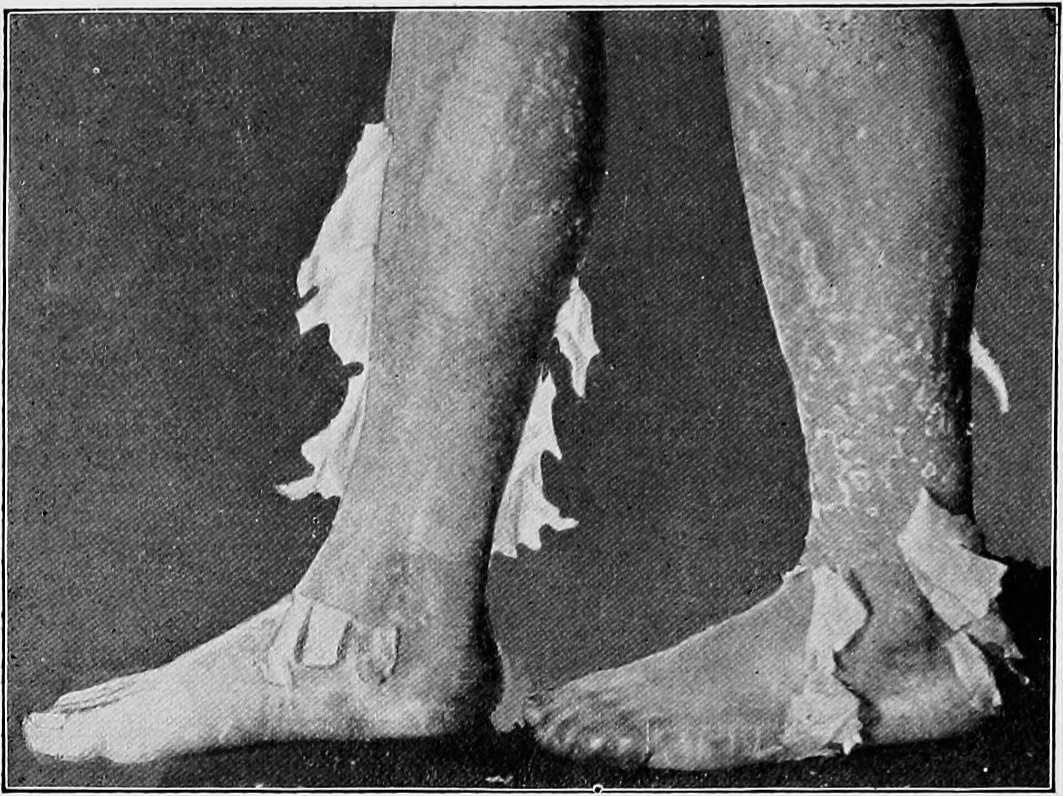
Peeling skin syndrome in the legs and feet

Peeling skin syndrome (also known as acral peeling skin syndrome, continual peeling skin syndrome, familial continual skin peeling, idiopathic deciduous skin, and keratolysis exfoliativa congenita) is an autosomal recessive disorder characterized by lifelong peeling of the stratum corneum, and may be associated with pruritus, short stature, and easily removed anagen hair.

"Acral" refers to the fact that the peeling of the skin is most noticeable on the hands and feet of this state. Peeling happens sometimes on the arms and legs, too. The peeling is typically apparent from birth, although it may start in childhood or later on in life as well. Skin peeling is caused by sun, humidity, moisture, and friction.

The acral form can be associated with TGM5.

== Syndromes ==
Peeling skin syndrome is also associated with 6 syndromes that are each caused by a different genetic defect. The various syndromes include peeling skin syndrome 1, 2, 3, 4, 5, and 6.

=== Peeling skin syndrome 1 ===
Peeling skin syndrome 1 is caused by a genetic defect in the corneodesmosin (CDSN) gene. This gene localizes to the human epidermis and other epithelia. The protein experiences a chain of cleavages during corneocyte maturation. Its symptoms include short stature, abnormality of metabolism/homeostasis, scaling skin, pruritus, erythema, asthma, brittle hair, and abnormality of hair texture.

=== Peeling skin syndrome 2 ===
Peeling Skin Syndrome 2 is caused by a genetic defect in the TGM5 gene. Transglutaminase 5 is best for catalyzing the cross-linking of proteins and the conjugation of polyamines to proteins. It also adds to the development of the cornified cell envelope of keratinocytes. Its symptoms include excessive wrinkling of palmar skin, skin erosion, hyperpigmentation of the skin, ichthyosis, and allergy.

=== Peeling skin syndrome 3 ===
Peeling skin syndrome 3 is caused by a genetic defect in the carbohydrate sulfotransferase (CHST8) gene. This condition is characterized by asymptomatic lifelong and non-stop dropping of the stratum corneum of the dermis. Its symptoms begin during the second half of the primary decade of existence and encompass generalized white scaling taking place over the upper and lower extremities.

=== Peeling skin syndrome 4 ===
Peeling skin syndrome 4 is caused by a genetic defect in the cystatin A (CSTA) gene, an intracellular thiol proteinase inhibitor that has an essential role in desmosome-mediated intercellular adhesion inside the lower levels of the dermis. Symptoms include well-circumscribed peeling of skin on the extremities and neck, generalized dry skin with fine scaling (and sparing of face), hyperkeratosis, and palmoplantar keratoderma

=== Peeling skin syndrome 5 ===
Peeling skin syndrome 5 is caused by a genetic defect in the serpin (serpin family member 8) gene. This gene is produced by platelets and can bind to and inhibit the function of furin, which is a serine protease involved in platelet functions. It is also characterized by superficial peeling of the dorsal and palmar pores and skin of the hands and feet; the pores and skin of the forearms and legs may also be involved. Its symptoms include superficial peeling of small areas of the skin that involve the dorsal and palmar surfaces of the hands and feet, superficial scaling of forearms and legs, and acanthosis.

=== Peeling skin syndrome 6 ===
Peeling skin syndrome 6 is caused by a genetic defect in the filaggrin (filaggrin family member 2) gene. The function for this gene is vital for normal intercellular adhesion within the cornified cell layers. It is also critical for the integrity and mechanical strength of the stratum corneum of the epidermis. Its symptom include dryness of the skin, peeling of the skin. erythema at lesion sites, bullae, and hyper-pigmentation.

== Signs and symptoms ==
- Abnormal blistering of the skin
- Abnormality of hair texture
- Dry skin
- Aminoaciduria
- Hyperhidrosis
- Ichthyosis
- Peeling of the skin (usually painless or itchy)
- scarring

May also include:

- erythema (redness)
- vesiculation (small blisters)

It is also important to note that there are several variances and subtypes from Generalized (all over the body) to Localized (Acral Type, mostly hands and feet). Additionally, some types have additional issues in contact with moisture, heat, friction, and dust.

== Treatment ==
There is no remedy for peeling skin syndrome. Treatment focuses on avoiding skin damage and treating symptoms as they occur. Ointments are also used to minimize skin peeling and when the blister grows, sterile needles may be activated. The condition can be exacerbated by hot temperatures, humidity, and friction. Individuals should be informed to avoid exacerbating triggers such as trauma, humidity, heat, perspiration, and water.

== Frequency ==
Only several dozen cases have been reported in the literature, making it rare. However, because its symptoms are mild and similar to other disorders, it could very well be under-diagnosed.

== See also ==
- Idiopathic calcified nodules of the scrotum
- Keratolysis exfoliativa
- List of cutaneous conditions
- Corneodesmosin
- TGM5
- Carbohydrate sulfotransferase
- Cystatin A
- Serpin
- Filaggrin
- Ichthyosis
