= Abundant life (disambiguation) =

Abundant life is a term used primarily in Christianity.

Abundant life may also refer to:

== Organizations ==
- Abundant Life Church, a Christian neocharismatic church based in Bradford, England
- Abundant Life Lutheran Church, a church in East St. Paul, Manitoba, Canada established by Julius Fahr
- Kaitaia Abundant Life School, a Christian school in New Zealand
- Abundant Life Christian Academy, a co-educational private school in Sherwood, Arkansas
- Abundant Life Christian School, a Christian school in Madison, Wisconsin
- Abundant Life Christian School, a school in La Unión, Lempira, Honduras
- Abundant Life Christian School, a Christian school in Wilmington, Massachusetts
- Abundant Life Broadcasting, former owner of television station K20JX-D

== The arts ==
- "Abundant Life", a song by BeBe Winans
- "The More Abundant Life", an episode of America: A Personal History of the United States
- The Abundant Life, a program of the Eternal Word Television Network
- The Abundant Life, a 1908 book by Rufus Jones

== See also ==
- The More Abundant Life, a phrase used by the U.S. President Franklin D. Roosevelt
- Abundant Living Faith Center, part of the Abundant Church in El Paso, Texas
- Power for Abundant Living, a 1971 book by Victor Paul Wierwille
- Abundant living system, a term for a pyramid scheme
- American Christian Press § Studies in Abundant Living Series, a compilation of pamphlets
