= Fehr =

Fehr is a German surname, most prevalent in the German speaking portion of Switzerland, and the Alsacian village of Bischwiller in France. Notable people with the surname include:

- Adolf Fehr (field hockey) (1904–1992), Swiss field hockey player
- Adolf Fehr (alpine skier) (born 1940), Liechtenstein alpine skier
- Anton Fehr (1881-1954), German politician
- Beat Fehr (1942–1967), Swiss racing driver
- Brendan Fehr (born 1977), Canadian actor
- Darcy Fehr (born 1974), Canadian actor
- Donald Fehr (born 1948), American baseball and hockey official
- Eric Fehr (born 1985), Canadian ice hockey player
- Ernst Fehr (born 1956), Austrian economist
- Hans-Jürg Fehr (born 1948), Swiss politician
- Henry Charles Fehr (1867–1940), British sculptor
- Konrad Fehr (1910-1993), Swiss field hockey player
- Albert Fehr (1921-1992), French industrialist
- Mario Fehr (born 1958), Swiss politician
- Jacqueline Fehr (born 1963), Swiss politician
- Johann Michael Fehr (1610-1688), German doctor, botanist and scientist
- Oded Fehr (born 1970), Israeli actor
- Oskar Fehr (1871–1959), German ophthalmologist
- Richard Fehr (1939–2013), Swiss Christian minister
- Rick Fehr (born 1962), American golfer
- Rudi Fehr (1911–1999), American film editor

== See also ==
- Charles Fehr Round Barn
- Fehr corneal dystrophy
- Fahr
