= Lac des Plagnes =

Lake in France

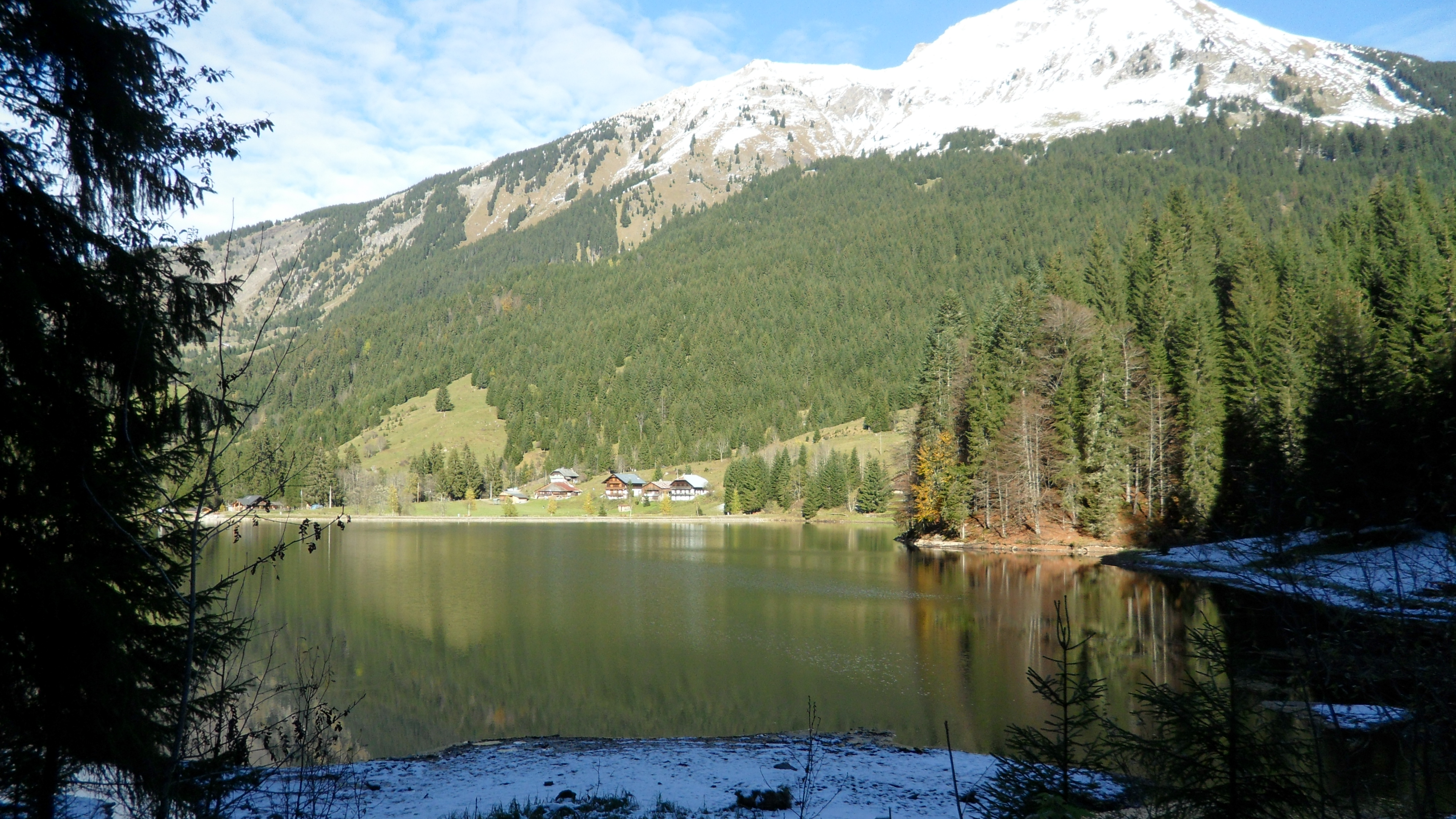

- Location within France
- Location: Abondance, Haute-Savoie
- Coordinates: 46°14′44″N 6°45′07″E
- Basin countries: France

Lac des Plagnes (French pronunciation: [lak de plaɲ]) is a lake in Haute-Savoie, France.
