= Keratolysis exfoliativa =

- Specialty: Dermatology

Keratolysis exfoliativa (also known as "lamellar dyshidrosis", "recurrent focal palmar peeling", "recurrent palmar peeling") is a sometimes harmless, sometimes painful skin condition that can affect the focal surface of the fingers and/or the palm or soles of the feet. It is often misdiagnosed as chronic contact dermatitis or psoriasis. It is characterized by dry skin and superficial, air-filled blisters. These blisters can be peeled off very easily and will leave reddish, tender areas. The loss of this corneal layer of the skin, which protects the underlying layers, leaves the skin more vulnerable to dryness and cracking.

== Causes ==
Keratolysis exfoliativa normally appears during warm weather. Due to excessive sweating and friction, in for example athletic shoes, the skin can start to exfoliate. Other factors that can cause exfoliation are detergents and solvents. Salt water fishermen have often reported symptoms, though it is unclear whether it is caused by salt water or bacteria from fish.

== Treatment ==
Normally, exfoliation is restricted to a particular area and normal skin will replace the exfoliated parts, so no treatment is needed. Since keratolysis exfoliativa is caused by friction, detergents, and solvents, these factors should be avoided. Creams, especially those with silicone and lactic acid are also helpful. In severe cases, photochemotherapy is an option.

== Prognosis ==
In most cases exfoliation resolves spontaneously and no lasting damage is seen. However, some patients experience cracking and even bleeding in extreme cases.

== See also ==
- Acrokeratoelastoidosis of Costa
- Peeling skin syndrome
- List of cutaneous conditions
