= Arthur Fehring =

Australian rules footballer

Personal information
- Full name: Arthur Fehring
- Born: 4 May 1900; Collingwood, Victoria
- Died: 19 April 1983 (aged 82); Caulfield South, Victoria
- Original team: Surreys
- Height: 183 cm (6 ft 0 in)
- Weight: 82 kg (181 lb)

Playing career^{1}
Years	Club	Games (Goals)
1919	Richmond	2 (0)
- ^{1} Playing statistics correct to the end of 1919.

Arthur Fehring (4 May 1900 – 19 April 1983) was an Australian rules footballer who played for the Richmond Football Club in the Victorian Football League (VFL).

In the fourth round of the 1919 season, he played beside his brother Charlie, the only occasion that they would appear together in the same VFL game.

The following year he started at Hawthorn in the VFA before accepting good money to play at Colbinabbin, Victoria.

His brother Charlie Fehring played for Richmond and Essendon.
