= Macular corneal dystrophy =

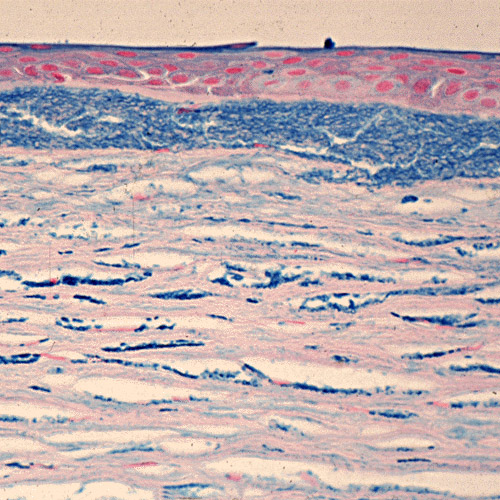
- Colloidal iron staining shows deposition of glycosaminoglycans in the cornea
- Specialty: Ophthalmology

Macular corneal dystrophy, also known as Fehr corneal dystrophy, is a rare pathological condition affecting the stroma of cornea first described by Arthur Groenouw in 1890. Signs are usually noticed in the first decade of life and progress afterwards, with opacities developing in the cornea and attacks of pain. This gradual opacification leads to visual impairment often requiring keratoplasty in the later decades of life.

== Signs and symptoms ==
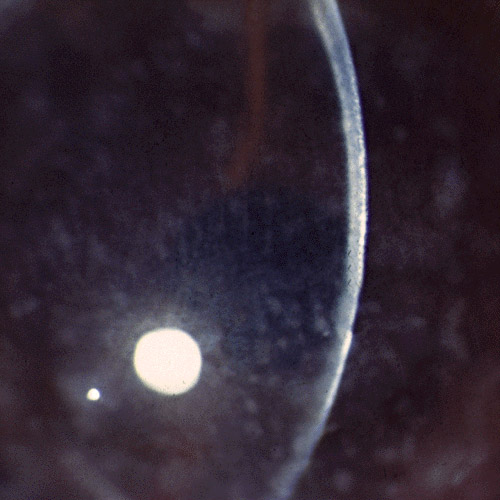
Opacities within the cornea upon ophthalmologic lamp examination.

The first signs of MCD are cloudy regions that appear on the cornea during adolescence, although opacification may be noticed as early as the first decade. These minute, gray, punctate opacities will over time merge into larger areas, causing the entire corneal stroma to become opaque. Ultimately this results in severe visual impairment, generally before the 5th decade of life.

While some individuals remain asymptomatic, initial symptoms typically consist of painful attacks with photophobia, foreign body sensations, and recurrent erosions. Corneal sensitivity is also reduced.

== Pathophysiology ==
Macular Corneal Dystrophy is an autosomal recessive genetic disorder caused by mutations in the carbohydrate sulfotransferase gene (CHST6), resulting in abnormal proteoglycan synthesis. The accumulation of abnormal glycosaminoglycans in the corneal epithelium and stroma leads to progressive opacification of the cornea and subsequent loss of visual acuity. There are three variants of MCD characterized by immunophenotype:

- Type 1: no detectable keratan sulfate in either the serum or cornea
- Type 1A: keratan sulfate is absent in the serum but stroma shows immunoreactivity to keratan sulfate antibodies
- Type 2: normal amounts of keratan sulfate in the serum and stroma

These three variants are clinically and histopathologically indistinguishable.

== Diagnosis ==
Histopathological staining shows characteristic alcian blue-positive deposits. Various imaging modalities, including confocal microscopy and ocular coherence tomography, can provide information about the changes within the cornea and may be suitable replacements for tissue biopsy and excision.

== Treatment ==
When visual acuity is impacted, various forms of keratoplasty are often indicated. While corneal transplant has traditionally been the standard treatment, less-invasive surgical techniques such as deep anterior lamellar keratoplasty and photo-therapeutic keratectomy are increasingly playing a role in management of MCD. While post-operative prognosis is favorable, reoccurrences may occur.

Various gene therapies, including enzyme replacement therapy and gene-targeting therapy, remain a potential future treatment modality for MCD.

== Epidemiology ==
While Macular Corneal Dystrophy is found throughout the world, countries with the highest prevalence include Iceland, Saudi Arabia, India, and the United States. In Iceland, MCD accounts for almost one-third of all corneal grafts performed. Estimates from Claims Data in the United States place the prevalence of MCD at 9.7 per million, which represents less than 1% of corneal dystrophies.

== See also ==
- Corneal dystrophy
