= TGM5 =

Human genetic transglutaminase enzyme

Identifiers
- Aliases: TGM5, TGASE5, TGASEX, TGM6, TGMX, TGX, PSS2, transglutaminase 5, TG(X)
- External IDs: OMIM: 603805; MGI: 1921426; GeneCards: TGM5
Enzyme activity
EC #	BRENDA	ExPASy	KEGG	MetaCyc
2.3.2.13	↗	↗	↗	↗

Gene location (Human)
Chr.	Chromosome 15 (human)
Band	15q15.2	Start	43,232,590 bp
Band	15q15.2	End	43,266,928 bp

Gene location (Mouse)
Chr.	Chromosome 2 (mouse)
Band	2|2 E5	Start	120,876,592 bp
Band	2|2 E5	End	120,916,322 bp
RNA expression pattern
Bgee	Human / Mouse (ortholog); Top expressed in: skin of leg; skin of abdomen; gingival epithelium; hair follicle; epithelium of esophagus; vulva; skin of arm; human penis; testicle; skin of thigh / Top expressed in: coelomic epithelium; paramesonephric duct; stroma of kidney; lip; germinal epithelium; esophagus; Smooth muscle tissue of renal pelvis; skin of abdomen; skin of back; skin of external ear; More reference expression data
BioGPS	n/a
Gene ontology
Molecular function	acyltransferase activity; metal ion binding; transferase activity; protein-glutamine gamma-glutamyltransferase activity
Cellular component	cytoplasm; plasma membrane
Biological process	peptide cross-linking; epidermis development; cornification
Sources:Amigo / QuickGO
Orthologs
Databases	NCBI: entry; OMA: entry
Species	Human	Mouse
Entrez	9333	74176
Ensembl	ENSG00000104055	ENSMUSG00000053675
UniProt	O43548	Q9D7I9
RefSeq (mRNA)	NM_004245; NM_201631	NM_028799; NM_001362724
RefSeq (protein)	NP_004236; NP_963925	NP_083075; NP_001349653
Location (UCSC)	Chr 15: 43.23 – 43.27 Mb	Chr 2: 120.88 – 120.92 Mb
PubMed search
- Wikidata
View/Edit Human	View/Edit Mouse

Transglutaminase 5, also called protein-glutamine gamma-glutamyltransferase 5, is an enzyme that in humans is encoded by the gene TGM5. It functions as a transglutaminase .

TGM5 encodes one member of the multigene transglutaminase family. Transglutaminases (TGs) are involved in protein cross-linking by catalyzing the formation of gamma-glutamyl-lysine isodipeptide bonds between adjacent polypeptides (Candi et al. 2005; Eckert et al. 2005). This process is particularly important in the terminal differentiation of the epidermis, where TGs heavily cross-link keratins and a range of differentiation-specific structural proteins, such as involucrin, loricrin, filaggrin, and small proline-rich proteins, in the formation of the cornified cell envelope in the biogenesis of the stratum corneum, the outermost, “dead” layer of the epidermis (Kalinin et al. 2002). This continuously shed outer layer of the epidermis performs the main barrier function of the skin. Recessive loss-of-function mutations in TGM1 have been shown to cause lamellar ichthyosis, a disease characterized by excessive scaling and shedding of the outer epidermis (Huber et al. 1995; Parmentier et al. 1995; Russell et al. 1995).

== Clinical significance ==
TGM5 mutations can cause acral peeling skin syndrome, an autosomal recessive genodermatosis characterized by the shedding of the outer epidermis. In the acral form, the dorsa of the hands and feet are predominantly affected. Ultrastructural analysis has revealed tissue separation at the junction between the granular cells and the stratum corneum in the outer epidermis. Genomewide linkage analysis in a consanguineous Dutch kindred mapped the gene to 15q15.2 in the interval between markers D15S1040 and D15S1016. Two homozygous missense mutations, T109M and G113C, were found in TGM5, which encodes transglutaminase 5 (TG5), in all affected persons in two unrelated families. The mutation was present on the same haplotype in both kindreds, indicating a probable ancestral mutation. TG5 is strongly expressed in the epidermal granular cells, where it cross-links a variety of structural proteins in the terminal differentiation of the epidermis to form the cornified cell envelope. An established, in vitro, biochemical cross-linking assay revealed that, although T109M is not pathogenic, G113C completely abolishes TG5 activity. Three-dimensional modeling of TG5 showed that G113C lies close to the catalytic domain, and, furthermore, that this glycine residue is conserved in all known transglutaminases, which is consistent with pathogenicity. Other families with more-widespread peeling skin phenotypes lacked TGM5 mutations. This study identifies the first causative gene in this heterogeneous group of skin disorders and demonstrates that the protein cross-linking function performed by TG5 is vital for maintaining cell-cell adhesion between the outermost layers of the epidermis.
