= Abondance cheese =

French semi-hard cheese

Abondance
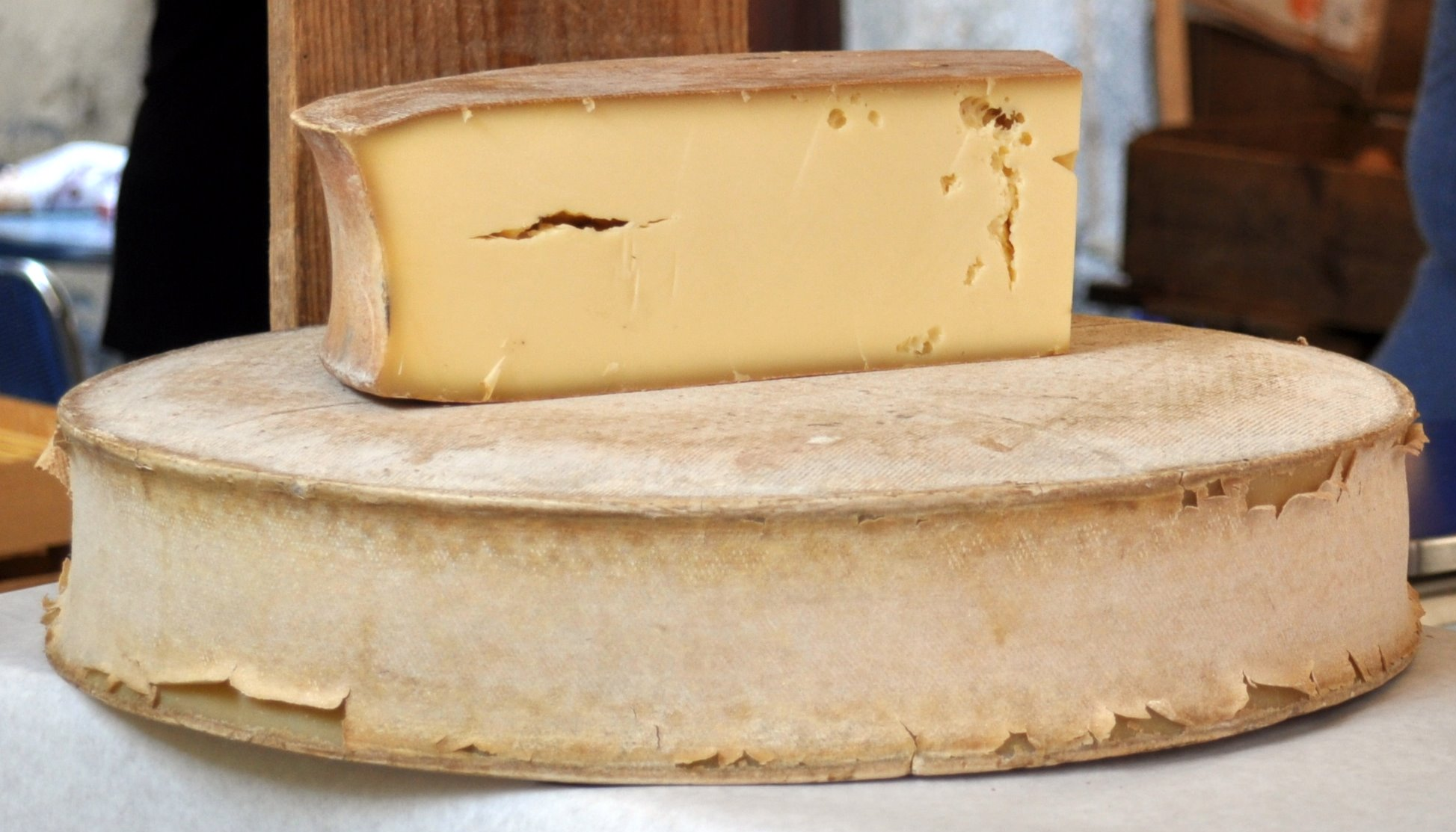
- Abondance cheese wheels
- Country of origin: France
- Region, town: Haute-Savoie, Abondance
- Source of milk: Cows
- Pasteurised: No
- Texture: semi-hard
- Aging time: 90 days
- Certification: French AOC 1990
- Named after: abondance, Val d'Abondance[*]

Abondance (French pronunciation: [abɔ̃dɑ̃s]) is a semi-hard, fragrant, raw-milk cheese made in the Haute-Savoie department of France. Its name comes from a small commune also called Abondance.

== Description ==
A round of Abondance weighs approximately 10 kg (22 lb), and its aroma is comparable to Beaufort, another French cheese variety. It has a nutty taste.

== History ==
Abondance has been known for its cheese since at least the 14th century, when monks from the Sainte Marie d'Abondance Monastery are recorded to have supplied cheese to the papal conclave at Avignon.

Abondance cheese was granted an appellation d'origine contrôlée (AOC) in 1990. It also holds an appellation d’origine protégée, meaning abondance makers have to follow strict rules to ensure traditional production.

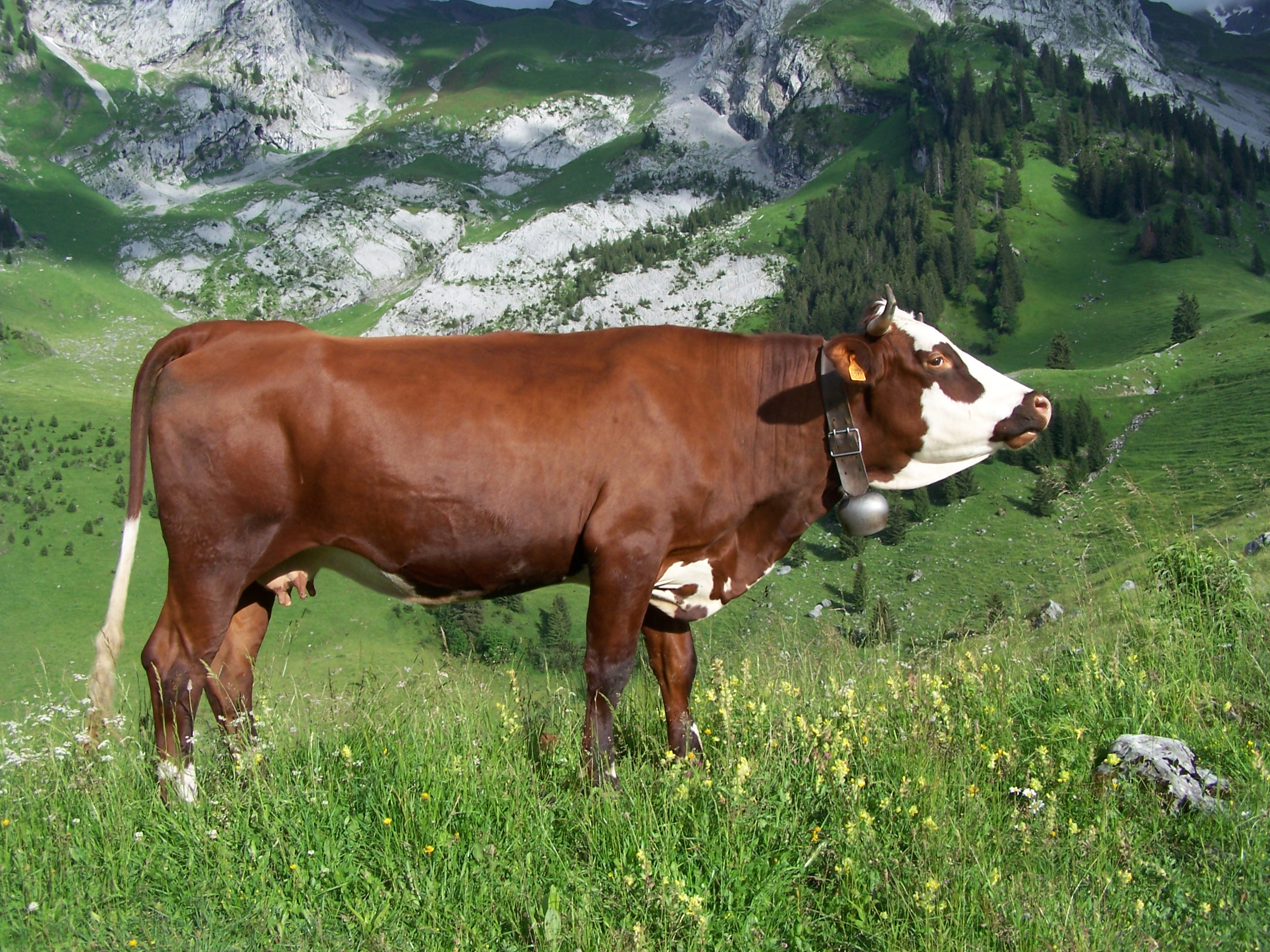
An Abondance cow in the Aravis Range

In 1998, 873 tonnes of abundance cheese were produced (+16.4 percent since 1996), 34 percent from local farms.

== Production ==
Abondance cheese can be either artisanal or farm-made; it is now made exclusively in the area of Abondance in Chablais, Haute-Savoie. Abondance is made from milk produced by three breeds of cattle: Abondance, Montbéliarde, and Taurine. The proportion of the Abondance breed within the herd of cattle that produces the milk must be a minimum of 55 percent.

The ageing period for Abondance is a minimum of three months on specially-prepared spruce boards.

== See also ==
- List of cheeses
