= CHST12 =

Protein-coding gene in humans

Identifiers
- Aliases: CHST12, C4S-2, C4ST-2, C4ST2, carbohydrate (chondroitin 4) sulfotransferase 12, carbohydrate sulfotransferase 12
- External IDs: OMIM: 610129; MGI: 1929064; GeneCards: CHST12
Enzyme activity
EC #	BRENDA	ExPASy	KEGG	MetaCyc
2.8.2.5	↗	↗	↗	↗

Gene location (Human)
Chr.	Chromosome 7 (human)
Band	7p22.3	Start	2,403,588 bp
Band	7p22.3	End	2,448,484 bp

Gene location (Mouse)
Chr.	Chromosome 5 (mouse)
Band	5|5 G2	Start	140,491,305 bp
Band	5|5 G2	End	140,511,479 bp
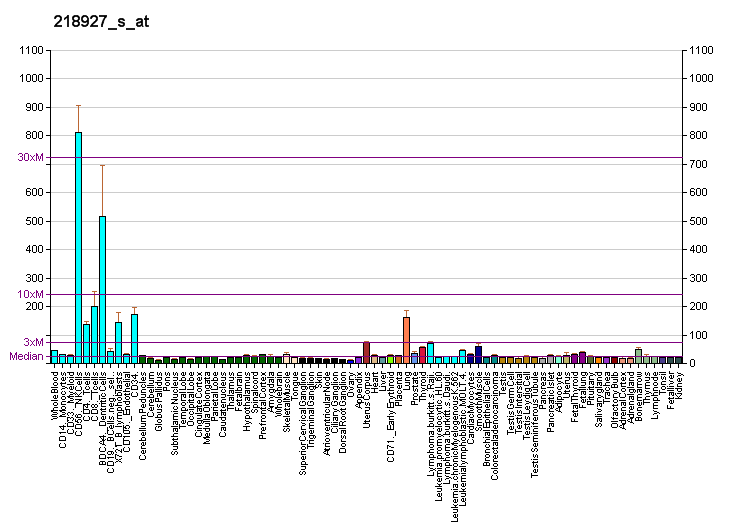
RNA expression pattern
Bgee	Human / Mouse (ortholog); Top expressed in: buccal mucosa cell; secondary oocyte; cerebellar vermis; granulocyte; synovial joint; stromal cell of endometrium; apex of heart; spleen; blood; bone marrow cell / Top expressed in: granulocyte; decidua; interventricular septum; ankle; calvaria; umbilical cord; lumbar spinal ganglion; stroma of bone marrow; white adipose tissue; yolk sac; More reference expression data
BioGPS	More reference expression data
Gene ontology
Molecular function	transferase activity; sulfotransferase activity; 3'-phosphoadenosine 5'-phosphosulfate binding; chondroitin 4-sulfotransferase activity
Cellular component	integral component of membrane; integral component of Golgi membrane; Golgi membrane; Golgi apparatus; membrane
Biological process	chondroitin sulfate biosynthetic process; dermatan sulfate biosynthetic process; carbohydrate biosynthetic process; carbohydrate metabolic process; proteoglycan biosynthetic process
Sources:Amigo / QuickGO
Orthologs
Databases	NCBI: entry; OMA: entry
Species	Human	Mouse
Entrez	55501	59031
Ensembl	ENSG00000136213	ENSMUSG00000036599
UniProt	Q9NRB3	Q99LL3
RefSeq (mRNA)	NM_001243794; NM_001243795; NM_018641	NM_021528
RefSeq (protein)	NP_001230723; NP_001230724; NP_061111	NP_067503
Location (UCSC)	Chr 7: 2.4 – 2.45 Mb	Chr 5: 140.49 – 140.51 Mb
PubMed search
- Wikidata
View/Edit Human	View/Edit Mouse

Carbohydrate sulfotransferase 12 is an enzyme that in humans is encoded by the CHST12 gene.
