= CHST10 =

Protein-coding gene in humans

Identifiers
- Aliases: CHST10, HNK-1ST, HNK1ST, carbohydrate sulfotransferase 10
- External IDs: OMIM: 606376; MGI: 2138283; GeneCards: CHST10

Gene location (Human)
Chr.	Chromosome 2 (human)
Band	2q11.2	Start	100,391,860 bp
Band	2q11.2	End	100,417,668 bp

Gene location (Mouse)
Chr.	Chromosome 1 (mouse)
Band	1|1 B	Start	38,902,948 bp
Band	1|1 B	End	38,937,242 bp
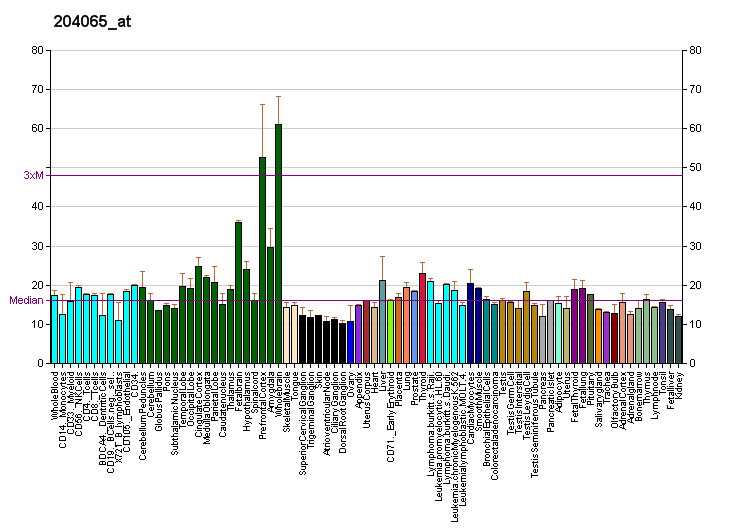
RNA expression pattern
Bgee	Human / Mouse (ortholog); Top expressed in: ventricular zone; ganglionic eminence; lateral nuclear group of thalamus; middle temporal gyrus; frontal pole; Brodmann area 10; right frontal lobe; Brodmann area 9; secondary oocyte; putamen / Top expressed in: lumbar subsegment of spinal cord; visual cortex; superior frontal gyrus; dentate gyrus of hippocampal formation granule cell; primary visual cortex; central gray substance of midbrain; cerebellar cortex; medial dorsal nucleus; dorsal tegmental nucleus; nucleus of stria terminalis; More reference expression data
BioGPS	More reference expression data
Gene ontology
Molecular function	transferase activity; sulfotransferase activity; HNK-1 sulfotransferase activity
Cellular component	integral component of membrane; Golgi membrane; Golgi apparatus; membrane
Biological process	cell adhesion; carbohydrate biosynthetic process; carbohydrate metabolic process; proteoglycan biosynthetic process
Sources:Amigo / QuickGO
Orthologs
Databases	NCBI: entry; OMA: entry
Species	Human	Mouse
Entrez	9486	98388
Ensembl	ENSG00000115526	ENSMUSG00000026080
UniProt	O43529	Q6PGK7
RefSeq (mRNA)	NM_004854	NM_145142; NM_001368780
RefSeq (protein)	NP_004845	NP_660124; NP_001355709
Location (UCSC)	Chr 2: 100.39 – 100.42 Mb	Chr 1: 38.9 – 38.94 Mb
PubMed search
- Wikidata
View/Edit Human	View/Edit Mouse

Carbohydrate sulfotransferase 10 is an enzyme that in humans is encoded by the CHST10 gene.

Cell surface carbohydrates modulate a variety of cellular functions and are typically synthesized in a stepwise manner. HNK1ST plays a role in the biosynthesis of HNK1 (see MIM 151290), a neuronally expressed carbohydrate that contains a sulfoglucuronyl residue.[supplied by OMIM]
