= Beaufort cheese =

French medium-hard Alpine cheese

Beaufort
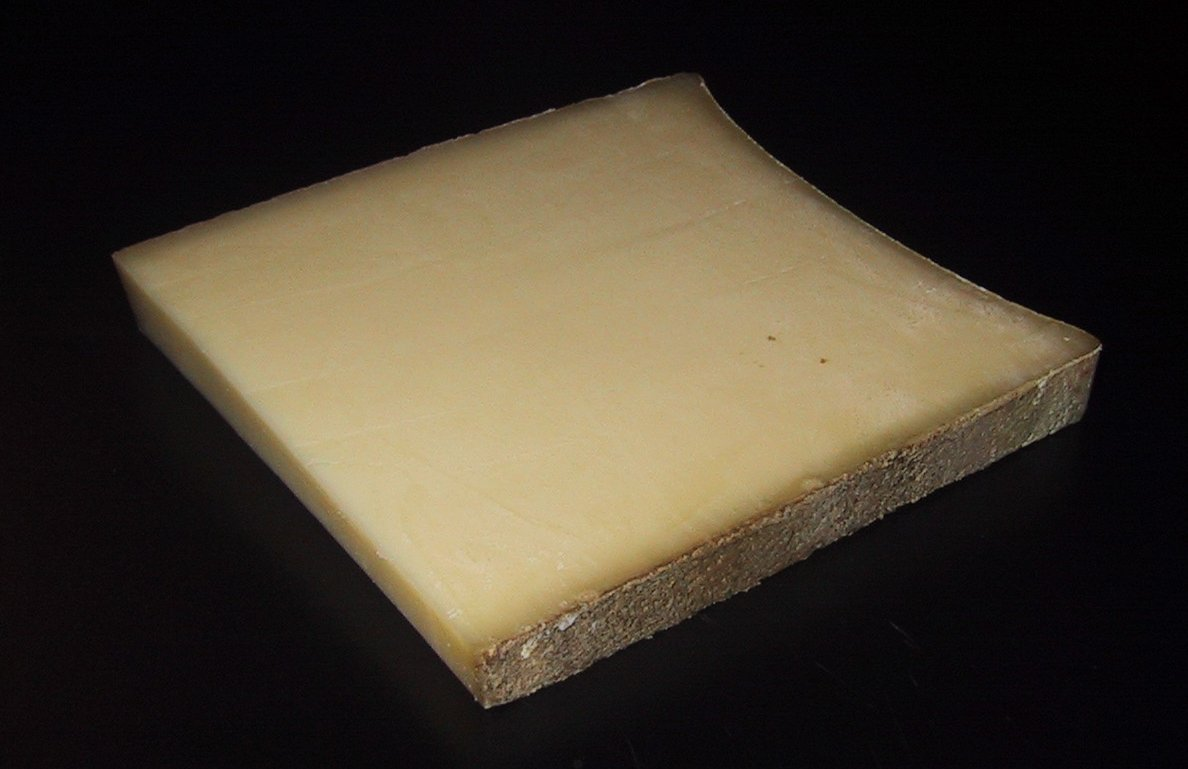
- Country of origin: France
- Region: Savoie, French Alps
- Source of milk: Cows
- Pasteurized: No
- Texture: Firm
- Dimensions: 35 to 75cm, 11 to 16 cm concave heel
- Weight: 20 to 70 Kg
- Aging time: 12-15 months
- Certification: French AOC April 4, 1968
- Named after: Beaufort

Beaufort (French pronunciation: [bofɔʁ]) is a firm, raw cow's milk cheese associated with the gruyère family. An Alpine cheese, it is produced in Beaufortain, Tarentaise valley and Maurienne, which are located in the Savoie region of the French Alps.

== History ==
A cheese mentioned by the Roman writer Pliny the Elder in the region Beaufort is made today has been suggested by the cheesemonger Patrick Rance to possibly resemble the modern Beaufort, though Pliny's lack of description makes any definitive identifications impossible.

== Varieties ==
There are three varieties of Beaufort:

- Beaufort d'été (or summer Beaufort)
- Beaufort d'alpage (made in chalets in the Alps on high pastures)
- Beaufort d'hiver (winter Beaufort)

== AOC Status ==
Beaufort was first certified as an appellation d'origine contrôlée in 1968.

== Preparation and production ==
Beaufort is produced in the Beaufortain, Tarentaise and Maurienne valleys, as well as parts of the Val d'Arly valley, all located on 450,000 hectares of the Savoie region.

The cheese is prepared using 11 liters (2.9 U.S. gal) of milk for every 1 kg (2.2 lb) of cheese desired. The milk used in one variety comes from the Tarine or Abondance cows that graze in the Alps.

To make Beaufort, the milk is first heated, acidified, and coagulated. The curds are then cast into a beechwood hoop or mold which gives the cheese its distinctive concave shape. It is pressed for 24 hours, taken out of the hoops and then cooled for another 24 hours. Once cooled, it is soaked in brine and then stored on spruce shelves for one to two months. During this part of the process, one side of the cheese is hand-salted each morning, then turned over and massaged each afternoon. Once the cheese rind has reached a level of maturity, the cheese is smear-ripened with a mixture called morge which produces its strong flavour and pale yellow rind. The prepared cheese must then age for 6–12 months, or even longer, in a cool mountain cellar.

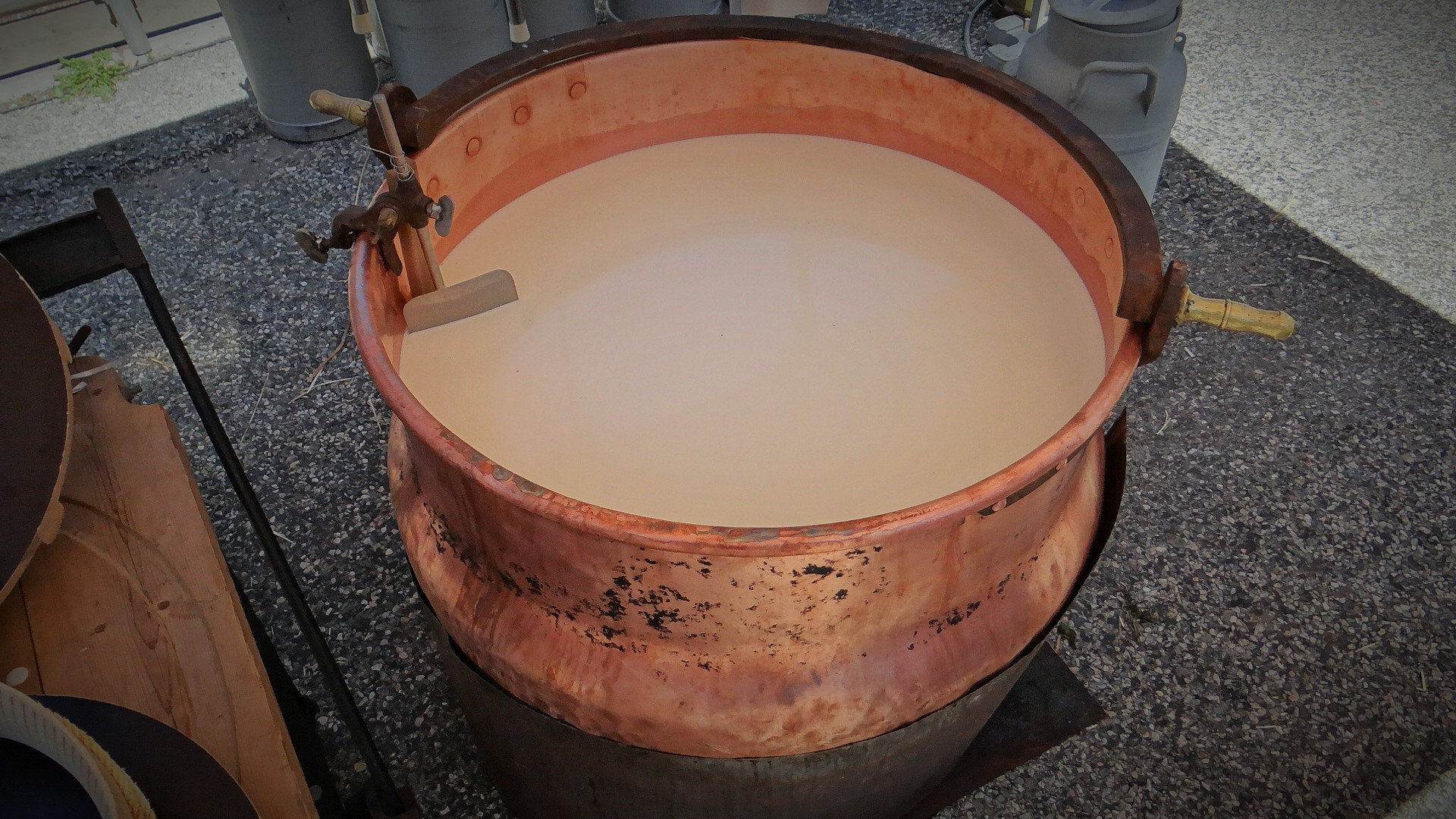
Reheating milk

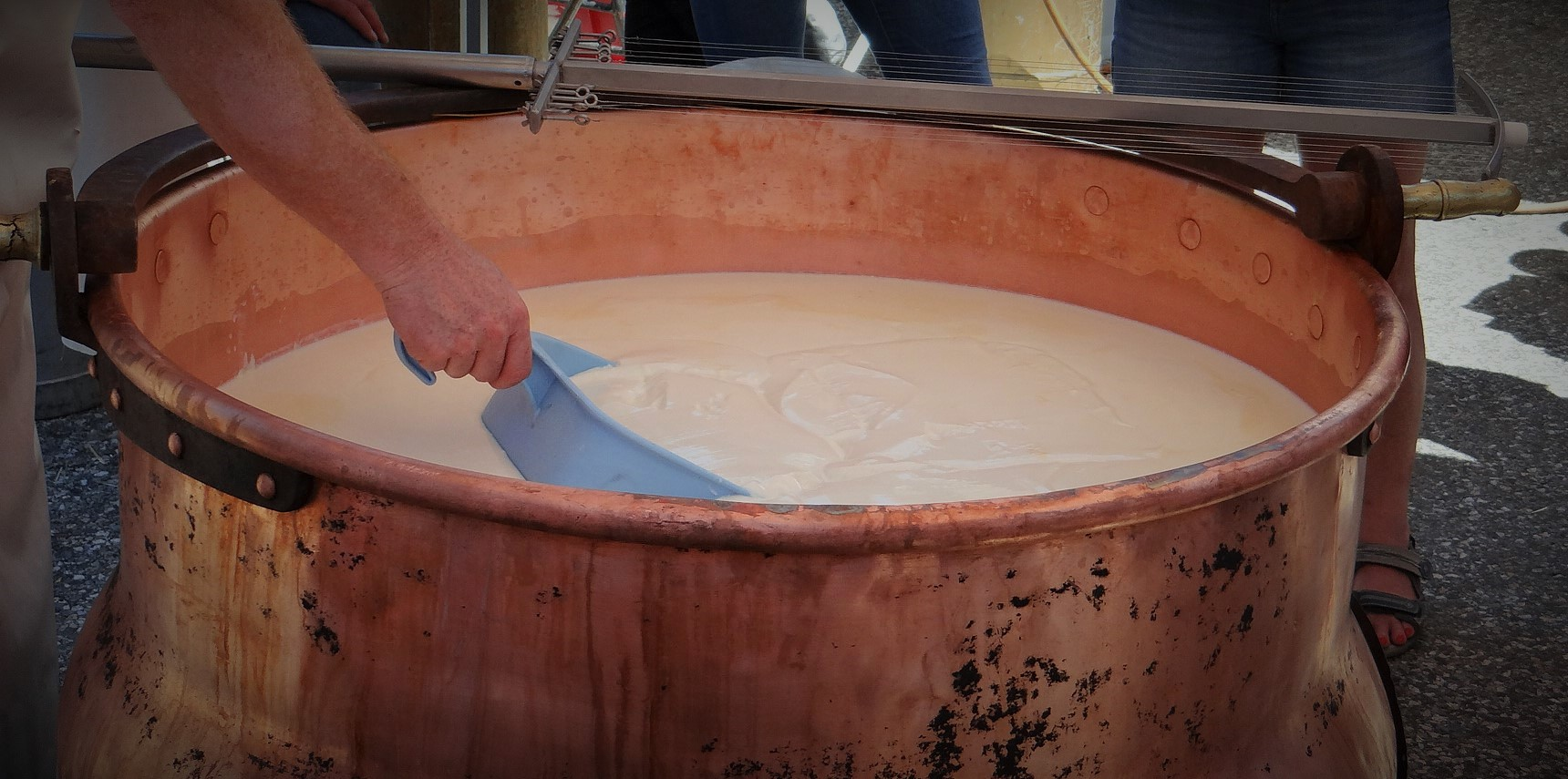
Milk curdling

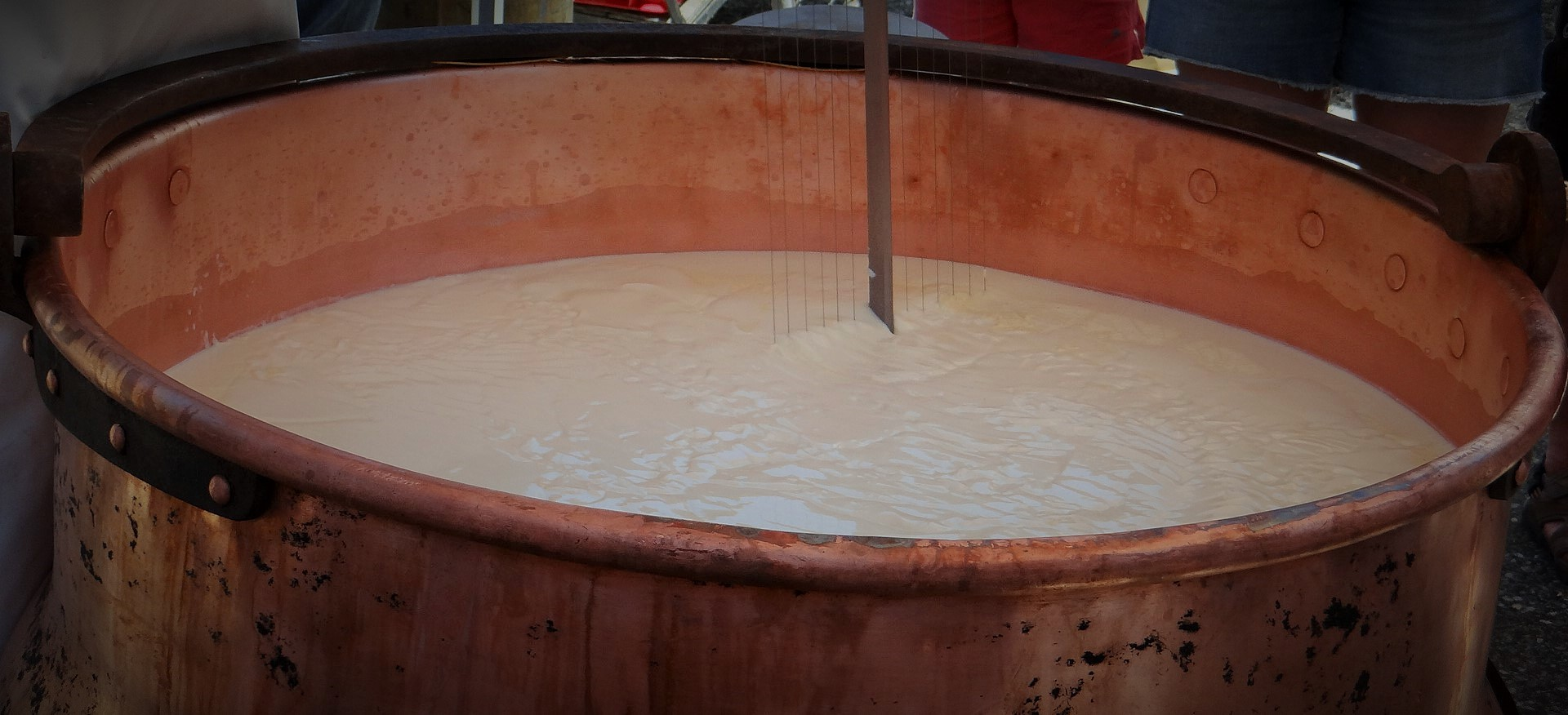
Scaling of milk

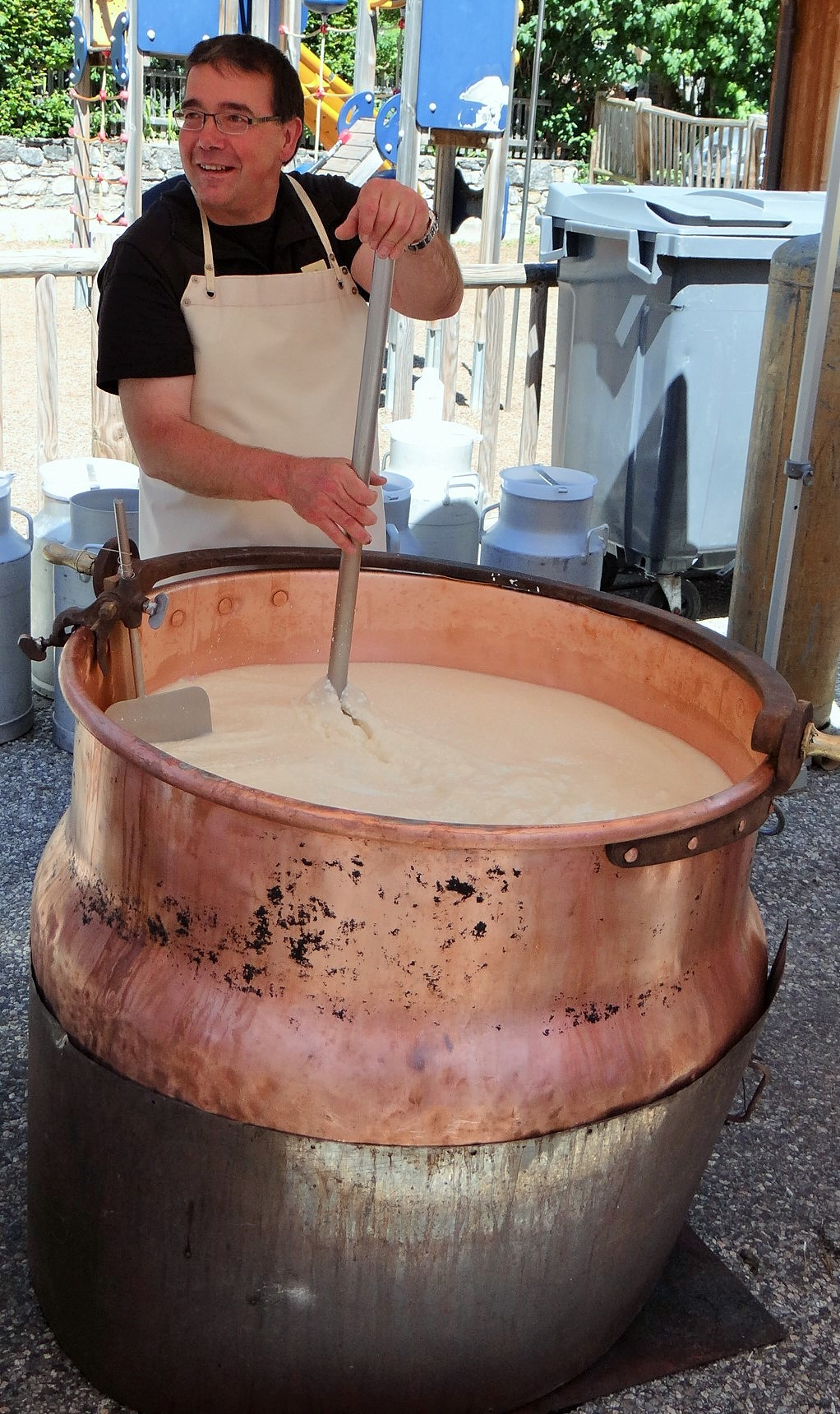
Brewing of milk

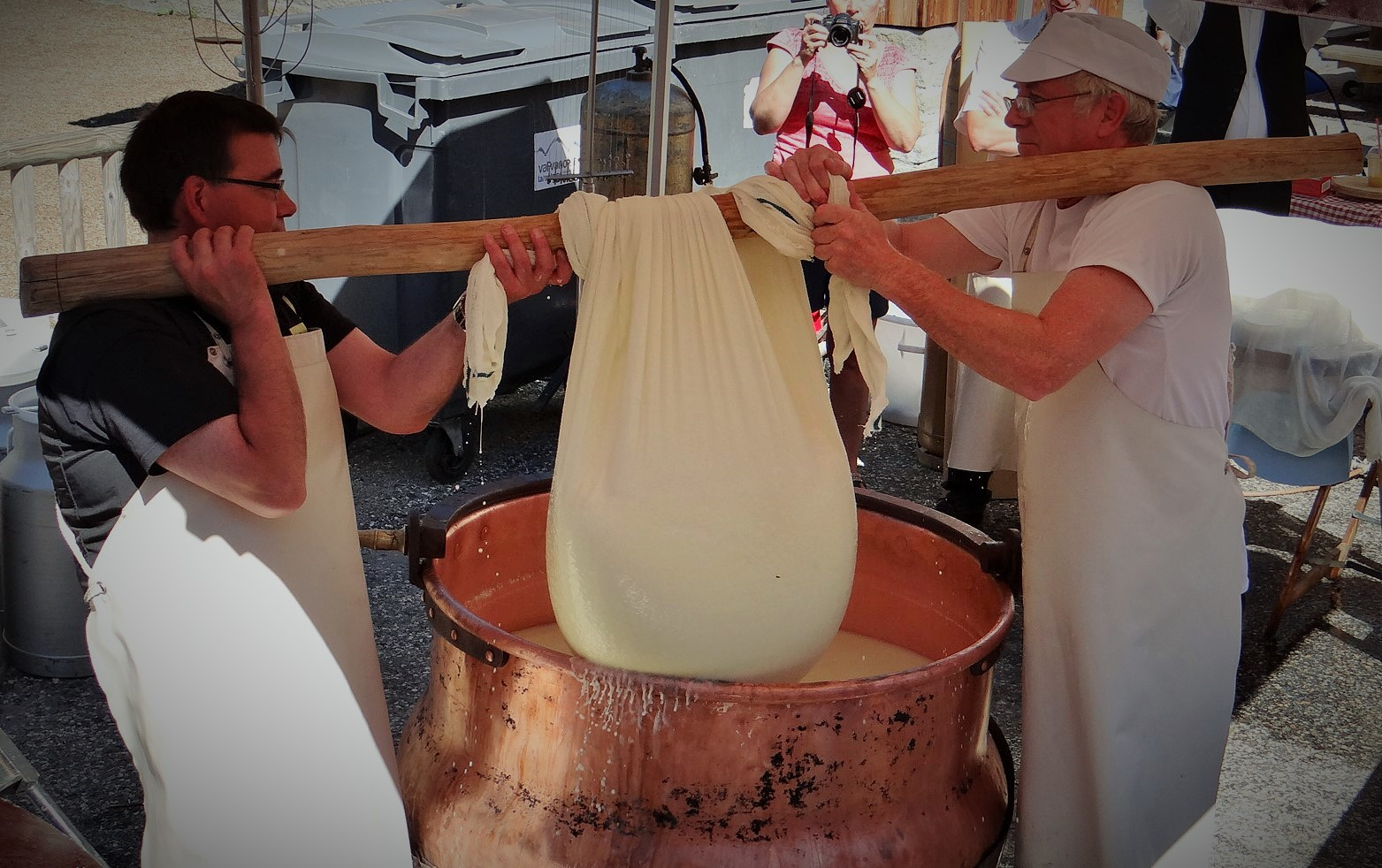
Mass of curd removed in linen cloth

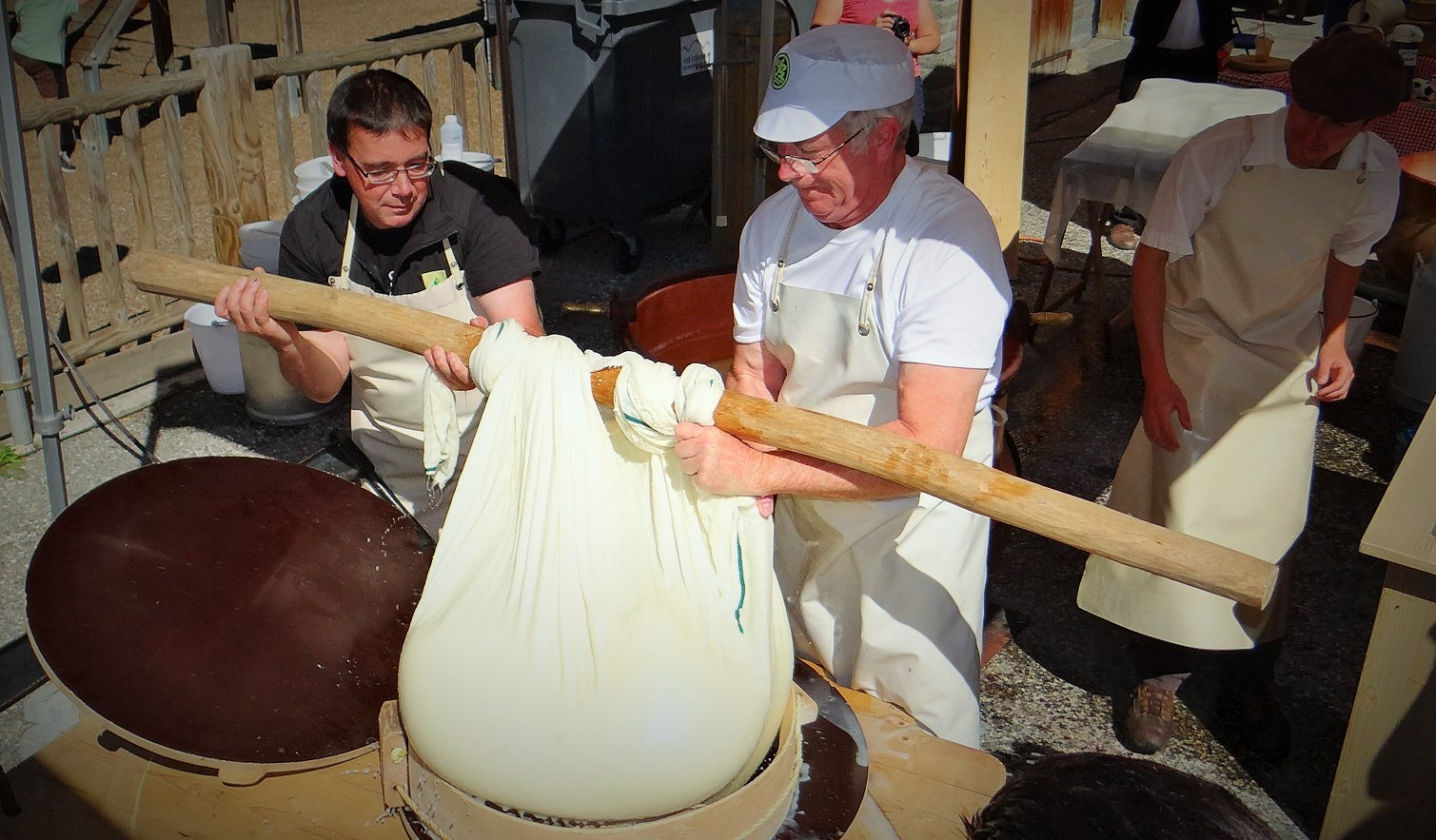
Molding in a circle of beech wood

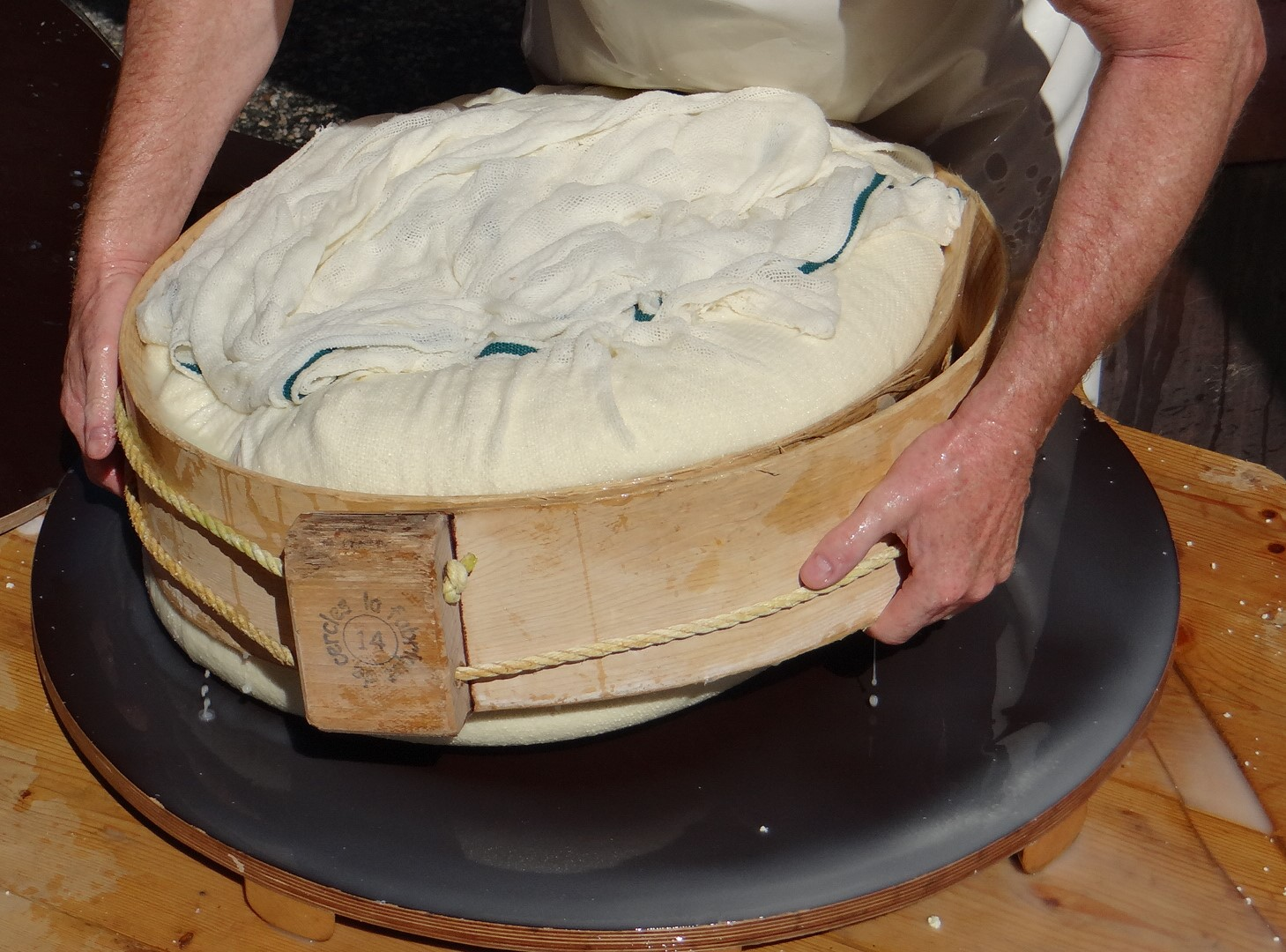
Molding in a circle of beech wood

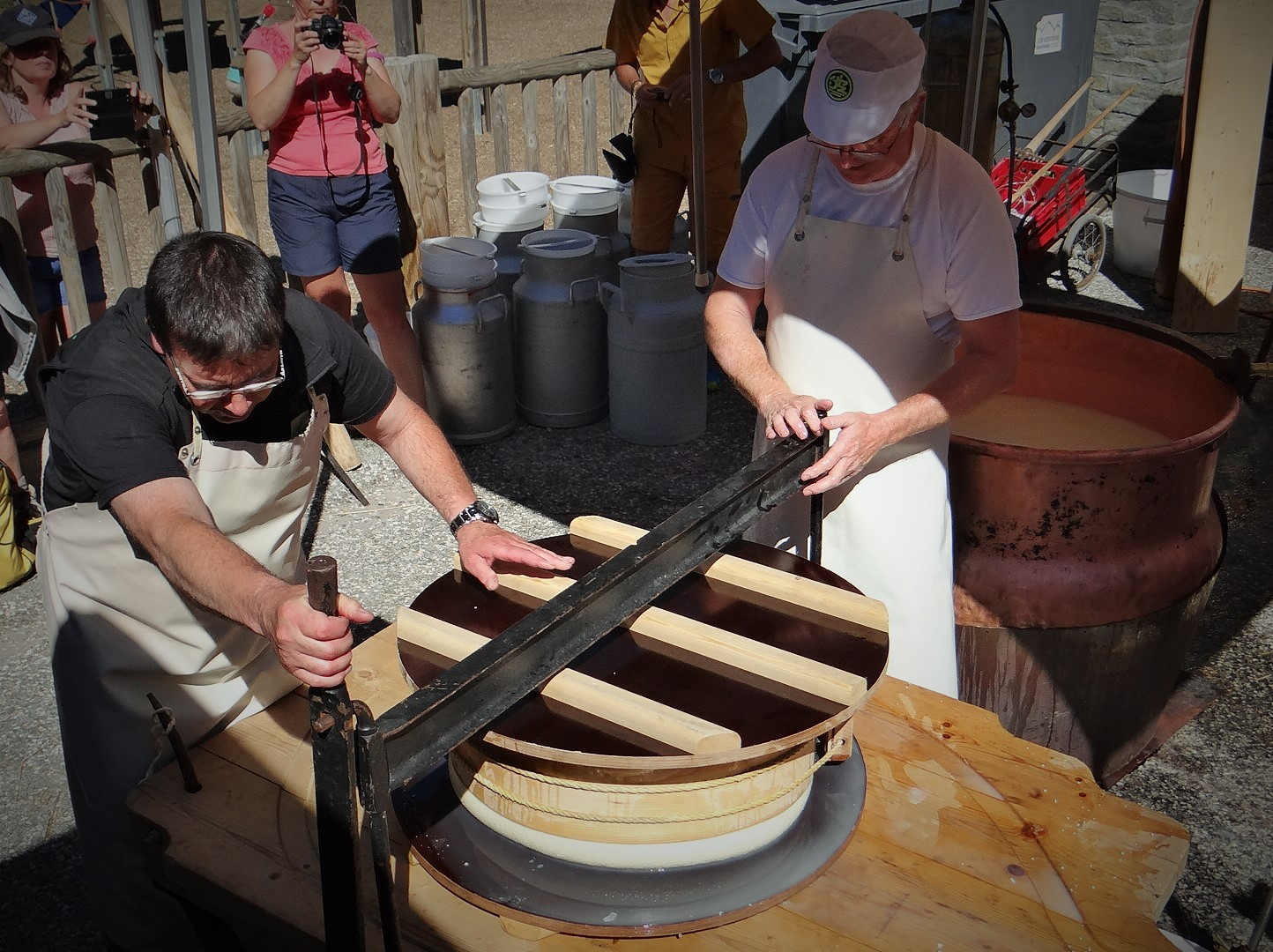
Pressing

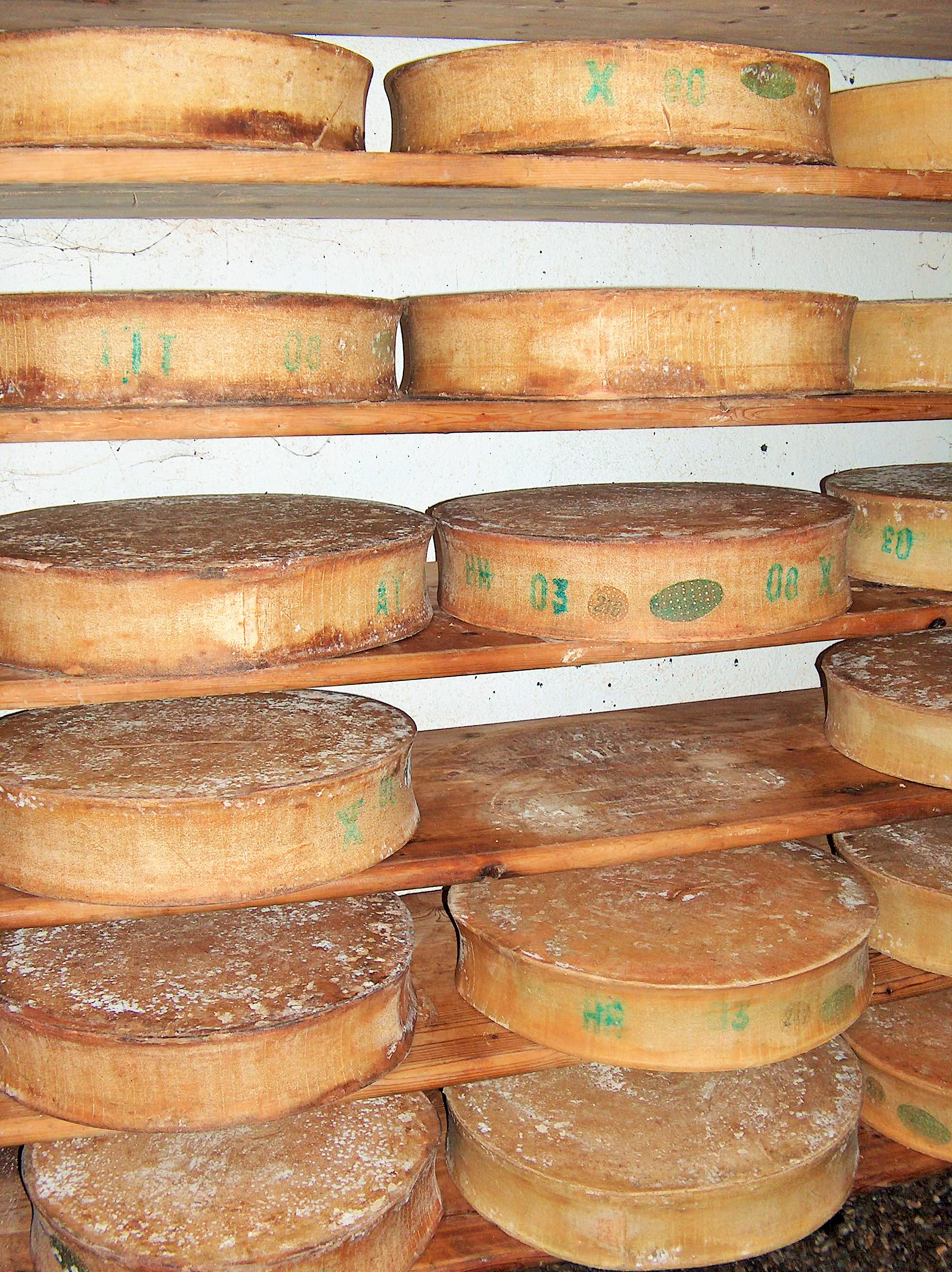
Ripening of Beaufort

== Taste and texture ==
Beaufort cheese is pale yellow, with a smooth and creamy texture and lacks the holes of some other alpine cheeses. Beaufort also has a very distinct aroma, sometime described as strong or mildly pungent and reminiscent of the pastures on which the Tarentaise and Abondance cows graze to provide the milk used for the cheese.

Beaufort is commonly used to make fondue because it melts easily. Beaufort is often eaten with fish, especially salmon, and sources describe it as pairing well with white wine.

== See also ==
- List of cheeses
