= CHST11 =

Protein-coding gene in humans

Identifiers
- Aliases: CHST11, C4ST, C4ST-1, C4ST1, HSA269537, carbohydrate (chondroitin 4) sulfotransferase 11, carbohydrate sulfotransferase 11, OCBMD
- External IDs: OMIM: 610128; MGI: 1927166; GeneCards: CHST11
Enzyme activity
EC #	BRENDA	ExPASy	KEGG	MetaCyc
2.8.2.5	↗	↗	↗	↗

Gene location (Human)
Chr.	Chromosome 12 (human)
Band	12q23.3	Start	104,455,295 bp
Band	12q23.3	End	104,762,014 bp

Gene location (Mouse)
Chr.	Chromosome 10 (mouse)
Band	10|10 C1	Start	82,821,332 bp
Band	10|10 C1	End	83,031,734 bp
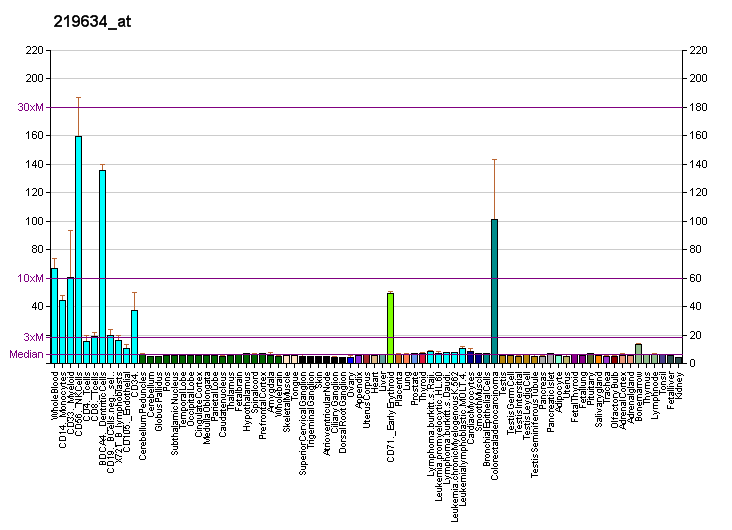
RNA expression pattern
Bgee	Human / Mouse (ortholog); Top expressed in: tibia; blood; cartilage tissue; monocyte; bone marrow cell; ventricular zone; granulocyte; amniotic fluid; trabecular bone; internal globus pallidus / Top expressed in: cumulus cell; molar; fossa; medial dorsal nucleus; condyle; vestibular membrane of cochlear duct; substantia nigra; subiculum; median eminence; arcuate nucleus; More reference expression data
BioGPS	More reference expression data
Gene ontology
Molecular function	transferase activity; sulfotransferase activity; N-acetylgalactosamine 4-O-sulfotransferase activity; N-acetylgalactosamine 4-sulfate 6-O-sulfotransferase activity; chondroitin 4-sulfotransferase activity
Cellular component	Golgi apparatus; membrane; Golgi membrane; integral component of membrane
Biological process	embryonic skeletal system morphogenesis; chondrocyte development; embryonic digit morphogenesis; negative regulation of apoptotic process; negative regulation of transforming growth factor beta receptor signaling pathway; post-embryonic development; respiratory gaseous exchange by respiratory system; cartilage development; developmental growth; regulation of cell population proliferation; embryonic limb morphogenesis; polysaccharide localization; post-anal tail morphogenesis; embryonic viscerocranium morphogenesis; carbohydrate biosynthetic process; chondroitin sulfate biosynthetic process; chondroitin sulfate metabolic process; carbohydrate metabolic process; proteoglycan biosynthetic process
Sources:Amigo / QuickGO
Orthologs
Databases	NCBI: entry; OMA: entry
Species	Human	Mouse
Entrez	50515	58250
Ensembl	ENSG00000171310	ENSMUSG00000034612
UniProt	Q9NPF2	Q9JME2
RefSeq (mRNA)	NM_018413; NM_001173982	NM_021439
RefSeq (protein)	NP_001167453; NP_060883; NP_060883.1	NP_067414
Location (UCSC)	Chr 12: 104.46 – 104.76 Mb	Chr 10: 82.82 – 83.03 Mb
PubMed search
- Wikidata
View/Edit Human	View/Edit Mouse

Carbohydrate sulfotransferase 11 is an enzyme that in humans is encoded by the CHST11 gene.

== Clinical relevance ==
Mutations in this gene have been associated to susceptibility for osteoarthritis.
