= Abondance cattle =

French breed of cattle

Abondance
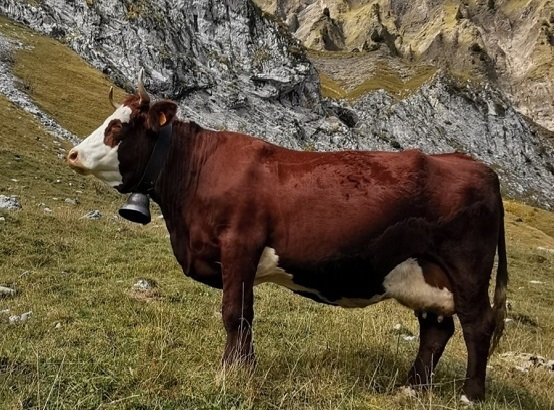
- Conservation status: FAO (2007): not at risk; DAD-IS (2024): not at risk
- Other names: Chablaisienne; Pie Rouge Française de Montagne
- Country of origin: France
- Distribution: Rhône-Alpes; Auvergne

Traits
- Weight: Male: 1000 kg; Female: 580 kg
- Height: Male: 146 cm; Female: 133 cm
- Coat: red with white head, belly, lower legs and tail switch; red patch round the eye
- Horn status: light, black-tipped
- Cattle; Bos (primigenius) taurus

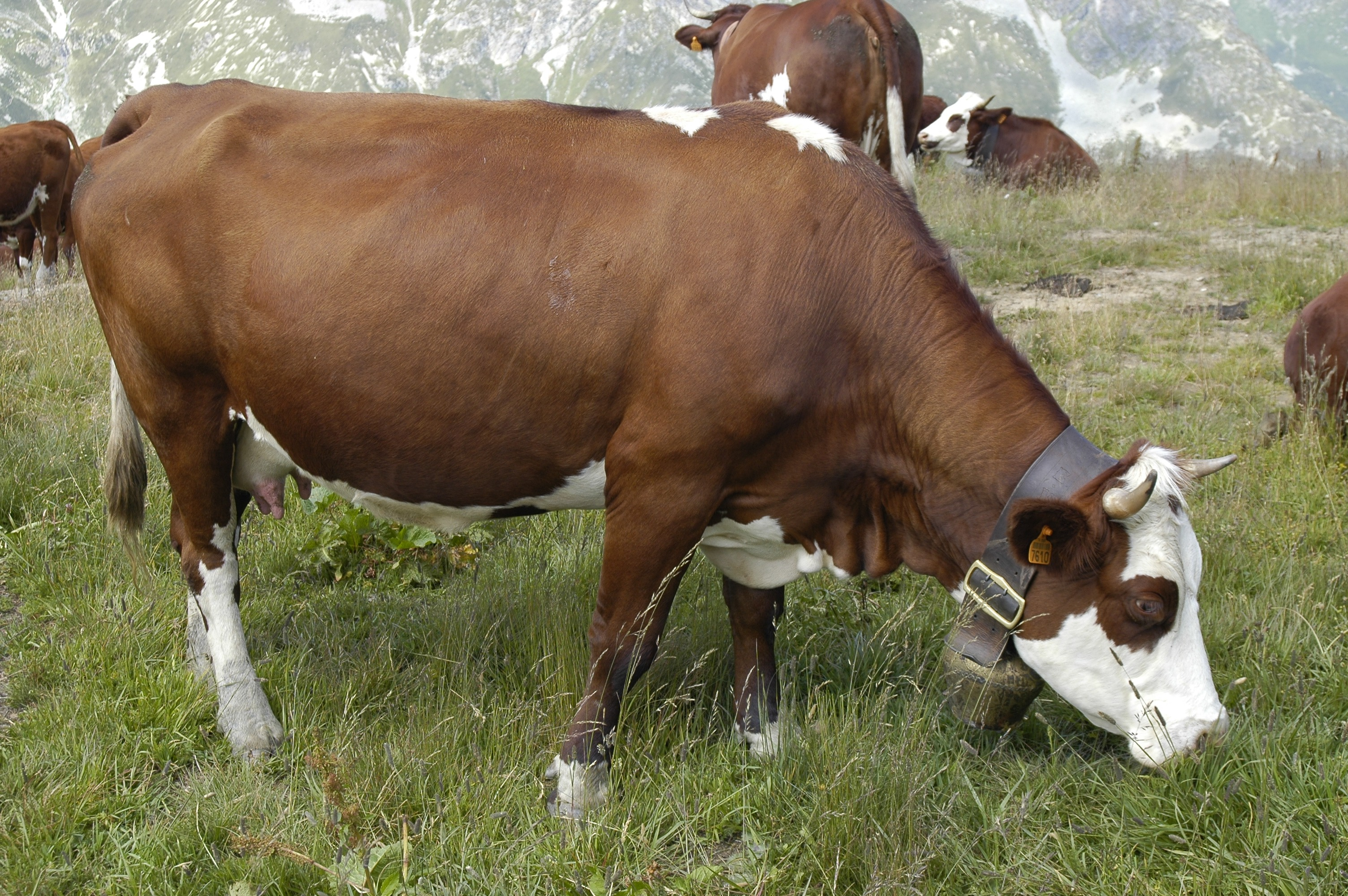
On mountain pasture

The Abondance is a French breed of dairy cattle. It originated in the high valleys of Haute-Savoie and shares its name with the commune and valley of Abondance and the former canton of Abondance in that region. Its area of origin lies within the former Chablais province of the Duchy of Savoy, and until the late nineteenth century it was for that reason known as the Chablaisienne.

It is distributed principally in Auvergne-Rhône-Alpes and is well adapted to rough grazing on mountain terrain. It is the fourth-most numerous French breed of dairy cattle; most of the milk produced is used to make Appellation d'Origine Contrôlée cheeses such as Abondance and Reblochon.

== History ==
The Abondance originated in the French or Savoyard part of the former Chablais province of the Duchy of Savoy, and until the late nineteenth century it was for that reason known as the Chablaisienne. A herd-book was started in 1891 or 1894, and the name was changed at that time to the present one.

It is the fourth-most numerous French breed of dairy cattle, and is distributed principally in the former administrative regions of Auvergne and Rhône-Alpes, now merged to form Auvergne-Rhône-Alpes. In 2021 there was a total population of about 78000 head, with 260 bulls and 44148 breeding cows distributed in almost 2000 herds; in 2024 the conservation status of the breed was "not at risk". Some have been exported to countries in Africa and Asia and to Canada and South Africa; in 2024 none were reported to DAD-IS from any country other than France.

== Characteristics ==
The cattle are of medium size: cows weigh between 550 and 800 kg and stand on average some 1.33 m at the withers; bulls weigh some 850 to 1100 kg, with an average height of 1.46 m.

The coat is a rich mahogany red, with white head, belly, lower legs and tail switch; there are patches of red round the eyes. Horns are present in both sexes; they are light, black-tipped and set on high.

== Use ==
The cattle are reared for milk, for meat and for conservation grazing; they forage well on coarse pasture. The average milk yield is 6274 kg or about 5950 kg in a standardised lactation of 302 days. The milk contains on average 3.74% milk fat and 3.29% protein. Some 80% of it is traditionally used to produce Appellation d'Origine Contrôlée cheeses such as Reblochon, Abondance, Tome des Bauges and Beaufort and Indication Géographique Protégée cheeses such as Émmental de Savoie and Tomme de Savoie.
