= CHST6 =

Protein-coding gene in humans

Identifiers
- Aliases: CHST6, MCDC1, carbohydrate sulfotransferase 6, GST4-beta, gn6st-5, hCGn6ST, glcNAc6ST-5, C-GlcNAc6ST
- External IDs: OMIM: 605294; MGI: 1931825; GeneCards: CHST6
Enzyme activity
EC #	BRENDA	ExPASy	KEGG	MetaCyc
2.8.2.21	↗	↗	↗	↗

Gene location (Human)
Chr.	Chromosome 16 (human)
Band	16q23.1	Start	75,472,052 bp
Band	16q23.1	End	75,495,445 bp

Gene location (Mouse)
Chr.	Chromosome 8 (mouse)
Band	8|8 E1	Start	112,615,768 bp
Band	8|8 E1	End	112,637,079 bp
RNA expression pattern
Bgee	Human / Mouse (ortholog); Top expressed in: bronchial epithelial cell; nasal epithelium; tibia; mucosa of paranasal sinus; olfactory zone of nasal mucosa; trachea; external globus pallidus; inferior ganglion of vagus nerve; subthalamic nucleus; pars reticulata / Top expressed in: vestibular sensory epithelium; utricle; trachea; cornea; iris; vestibular membrane of cochlear duct; trigeminal ganglion; lumbar spinal ganglion; stria vascularis; superior cervical ganglion; More reference expression data
BioGPS	n/a
Gene ontology
Molecular function	sulfotransferase activity; transferase activity; N-acetylglucosamine 6-O-sulfotransferase activity
Cellular component	Golgi apparatus; Golgi membrane; membrane; integral component of membrane; trans-Golgi network
Biological process	sulfur compound metabolic process; keratan sulfate biosynthetic process; N-acetylglucosamine metabolic process; carbohydrate metabolic process
Sources:Amigo / QuickGO
Orthologs
Databases	NCBI: entry; OMA: entry
Species	Human	Mouse
Entrez	4166	56773
Ensembl	ENSG00000183196	ENSMUSG00000031952
UniProt	Q9GZX3	Q9QUP4
RefSeq (mRNA)	NM_021615	NM_019950
RefSeq (protein)	NP_067628	NP_064334
Location (UCSC)	Chr 16: 75.47 – 75.5 Mb	Chr 8: 112.62 – 112.64 Mb
PubMed search
- Wikidata
View/Edit Human	View/Edit Mouse

Carbohydrate sulfotransferase 6 is an enzyme that in humans is encoded by the CHST6 gene.

It codes for an enzyme necessary for the production of keratan sulfate. Mutations in the gene lead to macular corneal dystrophy.
