= Abondance, Haute-Savoie =

Abondance L’Abâyie (Savoyard)
- Commune
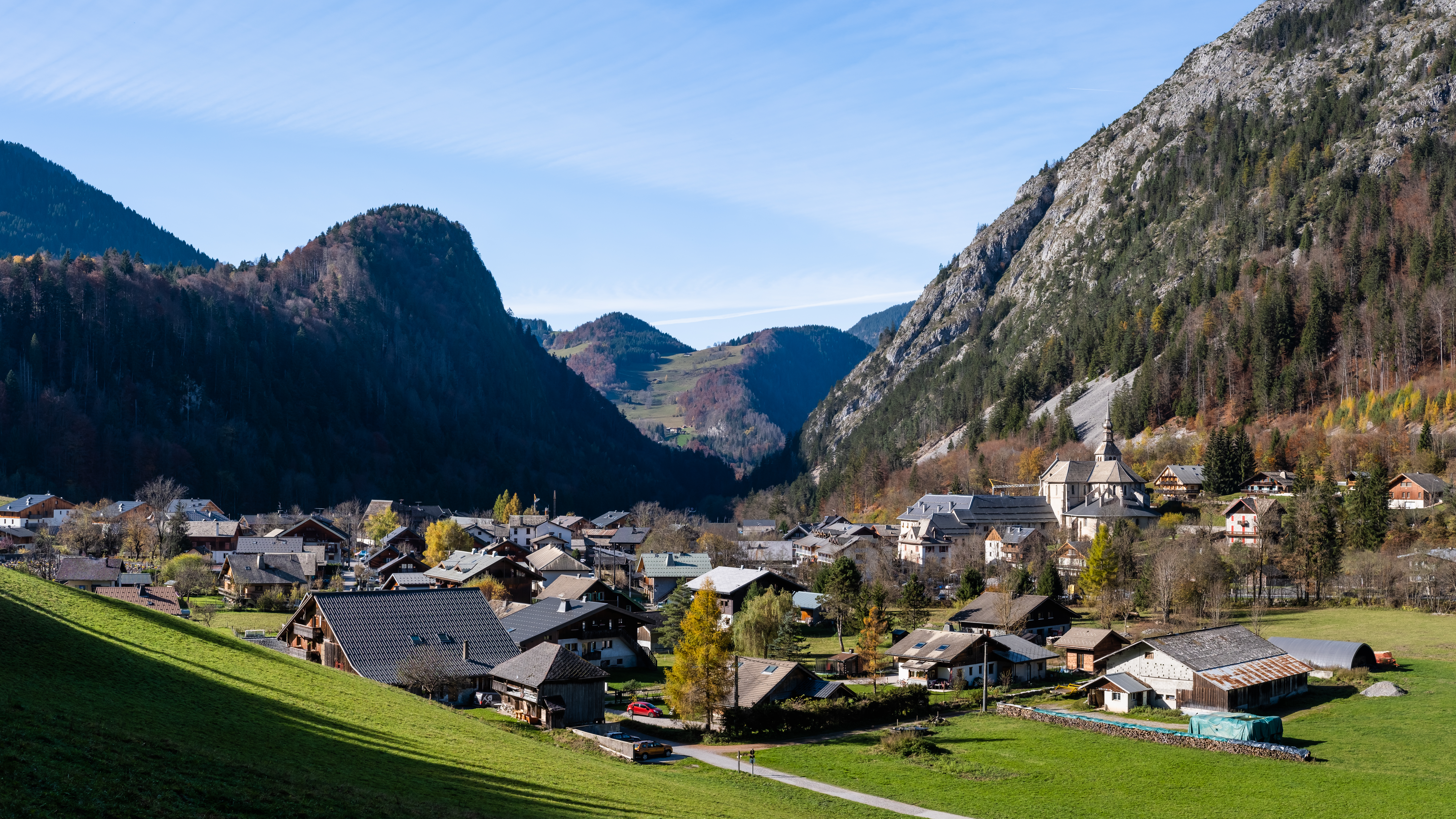
- A view from the south-east in 2024

- Coat of arms
- Location of Abondance
- Location within France Location within Auvergne-Rhône-Alpes
- Coordinates: 46°16′47″N 6°43′22″E
- Country: France
- Region: Auvergne-Rhône-Alpes
- Department: Haute-Savoie
- Arrondissement: Thonon-les-Bains
- Canton: Évian-les-Bains
- Intercommunality: Pays d'Évian Vallée d'Abondance

Government
  - Mayor (2020–2026): Paul Girard-Despraulex
- Area^{1}: 55.84 km^{2} (21.56 sq mi)
- Elevation: 930 m (3,050 ft)
- Highest elevation: 2,420 m (7,940 ft)
- Lowest elevation: 840 m (2,760 ft)
- Population (2023): 1,583
  - Density: 28.35/km^{2} (73.42/sq mi)
- Demonym(s): Abondanciers, Abondancières or Abondanciens, Abondanciennes
- Time zone: UTC+01:00 (CET)
  - Summer (DST): UTC+02:00 (CEST)
- INSEE/Postal code: 74001 /74360
- Dialling codes: 0450
- ^{1} French Land Register data, which excludes lakes, ponds, glaciers > 1 km^{2} (0.386 sq mi or 247 acres) and river estuaries.

Abondance (French pronunciation: [abɔ̃dɑ̃s]; Savoyard: L’Abâyie) is a commune in the Haute-Savoie department in the Auvergne-Rhône-Alpes region in south-eastern France.

It lies in the French Alps just south of Lake Geneva on the Swiss border. The people of this commune are referred to as Abondanciers.

Abondance has given its name to a variety of cheese made in the region, the breed of cattle from whose milk the cheese is made and the valley in which it stands. Other villages in the Vallee D'Abondance are Chatel and La Chapelle D'Abondance. It is a small and quiet town with several bars, hotels, restaurants, a bank, some food and ski/outdoor shops and a lively Sunday morning Market serving the Vallee D'Abondance. One of its features is the 14th century Abbey. The commune was founded around the year 1040.

In the 2006–2007 ski season, a year of very poor snowfall, a decision was made to shut down the town's ski area after a long period of loss-making. The town's plea for government aid to support the resort was denied due to its unlikelihood to return to profit due to lack of snow. However, the resort reopened in 2009–10 and each winter since has remained open throughout the season. L'Essert is the name of the town's ski area and it has 7 lifts and 13 runs, including two nursery slopes, 6 blue runs, 3 red and 2 black and a mountain restaurant. Ecole du Ski Francais operates in Abondance. In addition to downhill skiing, the resort has 10 km of cross-country ski and snow shoe trails. Summer visitors go to Abondance for the walking, history and outdoor activities.

Abondance is home to the international boarding school Sainte Croix des Neiges.

== Population ==
Historical population

| Year | Pop. | ±% p.a. |
|---|---|---|
| 1793 | 1,416 | — |
| 1800 | 1,375 | −0.42% |
| 1806 | 1,403 | +0.34% |
| 1821 | 1,411 | +0.04% |
| 1836 | 1,425 | +0.07% |
| 1846 | 1,464 | +0.27% |
| 1856 | 1,512 | +0.32% |
| 1861 | 1,446 | −0.89% |
| 1866 | 1,438 | −0.11% |
| 1872 | 1,483 | +0.51% |
| 1876 | 1,451 | −0.54% |
| 1881 | 1,460 | +0.12% |
| 1886 | 1,449 | −0.15% |
| 1891 | 1,412 | −0.52% |
| 1896 | 1,406 | −0.09% |
| 1901 | 1,456 | +0.70% |
| 1906 | 1,458 | +0.03% |

| Year | Pop. | ±% p.a. |
|---|---|---|
| 1911 | 1,448 | −0.14% |
| 1921 | 1,274 | −1.27% |
| 1926 | 1,258 | −0.25% |
| 1931 | 1,179 | −1.29% |
| 1936 | 1,149 | −0.51% |
| 1946 | 1,283 | +1.11% |
| 1954 | 1,307 | +0.23% |
| 1962 | 1,089 | −2.26% |
| 1968 | 1,115 | +0.39% |
| 1975 | 1,134 | +0.24% |
| 1982 | 1,152 | +0.23% |
| 1990 | 1,251 | +1.04% |
| 1999 | 1,294 | +0.38% |
| 2007 | 1,351 | +0.54% |
| 2012 | 1,354 | +0.04% |
| 2017 | 1,439 | +1.23% |
| 2023 | 1,583 | +1.60% |

Source: EHESS (1793-1999) and INSEE
