= Charlie Fehring =

Australian rules footballer

Personal information
- Full name: Charles Henry Fehring
- Born: 21 March 1899; Clifton Hill, Victoria
- Died: 30 November 1981 (aged 82)
- Original team: Surreys
- Height: 188 cm (6 ft 2 in)
- Weight: 108 kg (238 lb)
- Position: forward

Playing career^{1}
Years	Club	Games (Goals)
1917–1919	Richmond	21 (24)
1921	Essendon	4 (8)
Total		25 (32)
- ^{1} Playing statistics correct to the end of 1921.

Charles Fehring (21 March 1899 – 30 November 1981) was an Australian rules footballer who played with Richmond and Essendon in the Victorian Football League (VFL).

A forward, Fehring was recruited from Surreys. He was Richmond's leading goal-kicker in the 1917 VFL season, despite kicking just 14 goals, from his 11 appearances. The following year he featured just once, but played nine games for Richmond in 1919. In the fourth round of the 1919 season, he played beside his brother Arthur, the only occasion that would appear together in the same VFL game.

Fehring spent the 1920 season in the Victorian Football Association, playing with Hawthorn. He joined Essendon in 1921 and kicked four goals in each of his first two games, against Geelong and South Melbourne respectively.
