= Fountain de la Abundancia =

Coordinates: 40.4109°N 3.7090°W

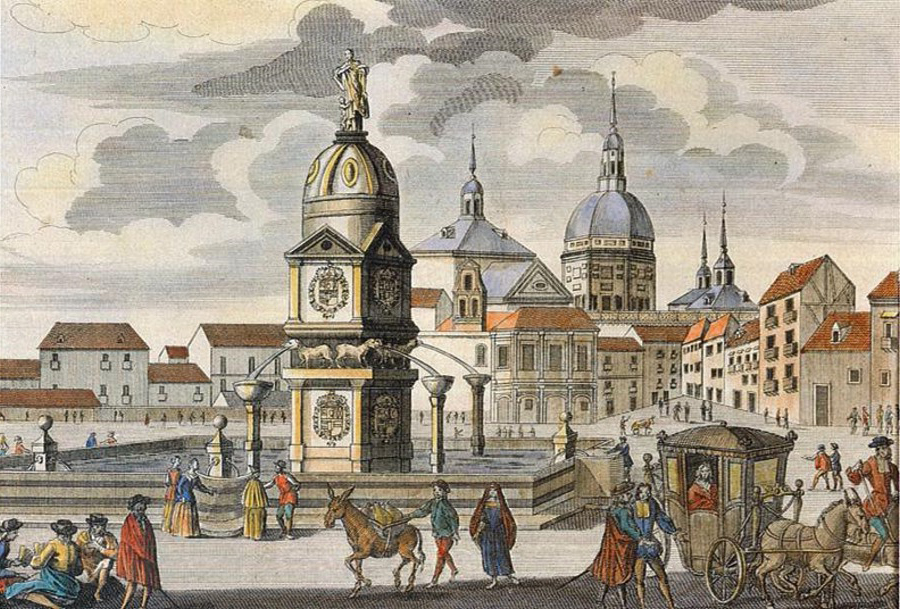
Fountain of la Abundancia, an engraving by Haered.

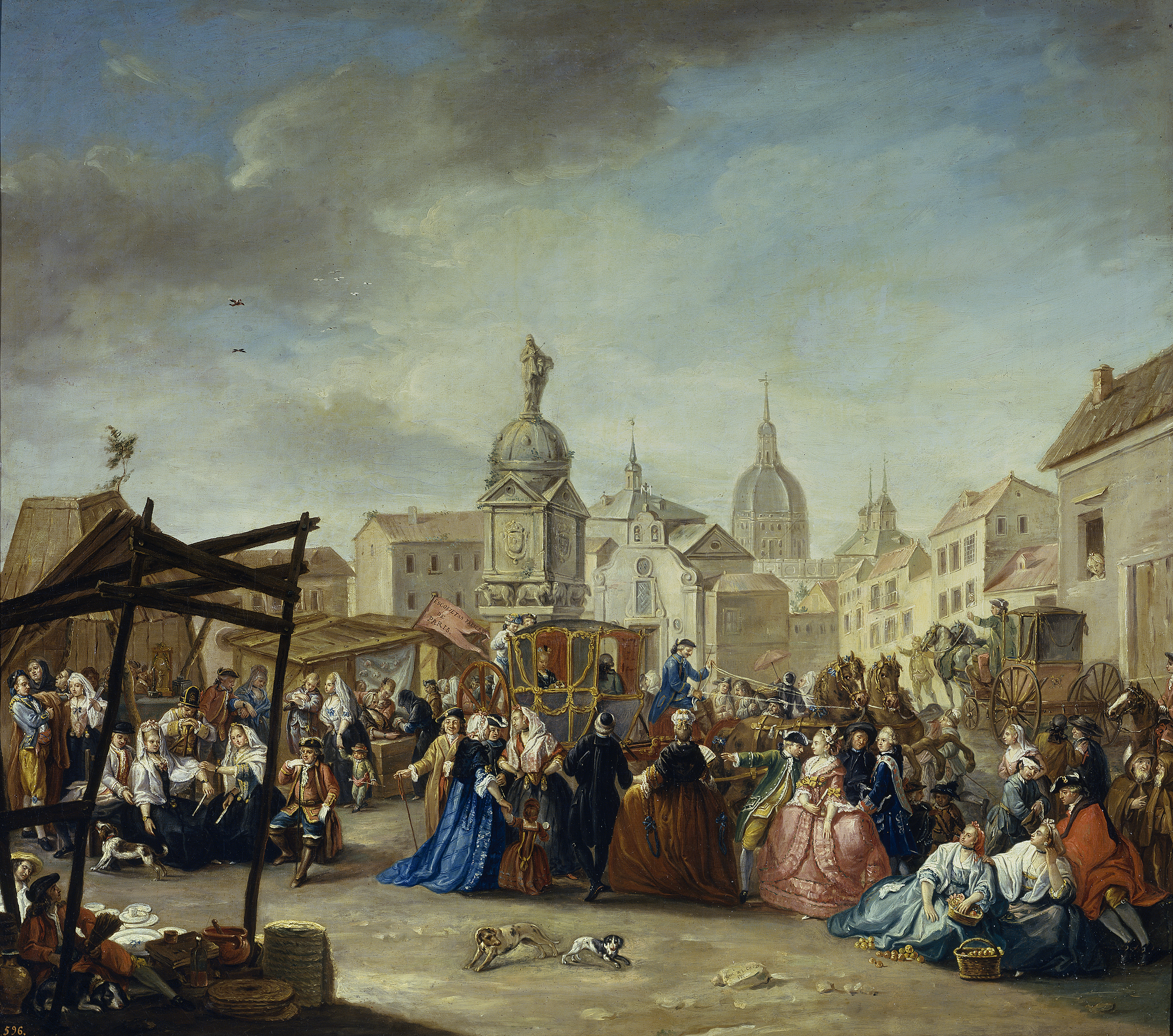
The Fair of Madrid in the Plaza de la Cebada by Manuel de la Cruz Vázquez, showing the fountain of La Abundancia at bottom (c. 1780). Museo del Prado.

The Fountain of la Abundancia, or Fuente de la Abundancia, was located in the Plaza de la Cebada in Madrid, for this plaza also was known by this name. It has retained several architectural elements and various coats of arms, which were saved from demolition work which took place in the 19th century, to be integrated into a new structure.

Now part of it preserves in la Fuentecilla fountain, another fountain of monumental size, located on Calle de Toledo, which was built in 1815 as a tribute to King Ferdinand VII. It has also remains a sculpture of a woman with a child, some researchers identify with la Abundance, the figure that named the fountain.

== History and description ==
The Fountain of la Abundancia was designed in 1617 by the Madrilenian architect Juan Gómez de Mora, whom also built the Fuente de Orfeo in the Plaza de la Provincia, conceived almost simultaneously. Its implementation was entrusted to the builder master Pedro Pedrosa and stonemason master Martín de Gortayri.

True to his office, Gómez de Mora opted for a more sculptural than architectural solution, in which there are clear Herrerian influences, although odd concession to the emerging Baroque trends of the moment.

The fountain was formed by a quadrangular temple of classical nature. This was crowned in each of its four sides, with a triangular pediment and, at the top, with a dome, on which rested the sculptural group of the Abundance.

As for the ornaments, the front were decorated with coats of arms, alluding to the City of Madrid and the Crown. But what was most striking across the open cavity in the middle of the main body, in which were staying four bears, throwing water, a clear reference to one of the symbols of the capital.

The construction finally was performed made significant changes to the initial design. The structure planned to build was much slimmer, resting the bandstand on a stronger foothold, which had masks instead of coats of arms carved later.

With regard to the coronation, the first idea that had Gómez de Mora was finish the set with a small obelisk, but eventually was placed on top the statue of the Abundance, that the Madrilenian council bought to the Italian merchant Ludovico Turchi in 1617. It represented a woman standing with a child on her right.

It is not known very well about the whereabouts of this sculpture, after the destruction of the fountain in 1840. Although there is no confirmation about different authors argue that the figure of alabaster, from the collection of the Museo de Historia de Madrid (former Municipal Museum) is the Abundance that acquired Turchi in Italy.

Near the place where was nailed this Baroque work, currently it stands a fountain of molten iron, comprising a circular vessel and a shaft, from which hang eight suppliers. It was inaugurated in 1999, in the ensanche formed in Calle de Toledo in its contact with the Plaza de la Cebada.

Beyond sharing the name of Fuente de la Cebada, this modern building has nothing to do with the original structure designed by Gómez de Mora. And everything to do with an architectural standard widely used in the second half of the 19th and early 20th century, when iron architecture became popular.

=== La Fuentecilla ===
La Fuentecilla fountain was made in part with materials from different buildings. In the case of its prismatic granite body, seized almost entirely from the Fountain of la Abundancia.

Of it also borrowed the triangular pediments and some coats of arms of the city of Madrid, from the fountain of La Abundancia.

At the top of this fountain, was installed a sculpture, depicting a lion with two globes, referring to the overseas possessions of Spain. The figure of the animal was rescued from the Convent of the Premonstratensians, disappeared during the Napoleonic invasion.

Although it serves as a public fountain, actually La Fuentecilla was erected as a memorial to celebrate the return of Ferdinand VII, once concluded the War of Independence.
