= Abundance Investment =

- Type: Private limited
- Industry: Financial services
- Founded: 2009
- Headquarters: UK
- Key people: Karl Harder (Director); Louise Wilson (Director); Bruce Davis (Non-Executive Director)
- Services: Crowd funding
- Website: abundanceinvestment.com

Abundance Investment is a UK-based online investment platform which claims to offer ethical and socially beneficial investments that contribute to a green economy. The company has raised funding for a wide range of renewable energy technologies (like wind, solar, tidal and pumped-storage hydroelectricity) and other low carbon infrastructure (EV charging stations and sustainable forestry).

In 2020, it started raising money for local authorities to support their net zero plans – 84% of councils have created specific plans - to support in turn the UK government’s legally binding target of reaching net zero by 2050. Raising money for councils which the platform calls Community Municipal Investing (CMI) has been the platform’s main area of activity in recent years.

== History and aims ==
Abundance launched to the public in April 2012 as the first crowdfunding platform to be authorised and regulated by the Financial Conduct Authority.

Abundance’s aim is to let people use their money to create change by investing in councils and projects “that are transforming the places we live for the better”. In its first 12 years, Abundance raised around £140m from predominantly retail investors for over 45 sustainable infrastructure companies in the form of bonds, known on the platform as debentures.

The bonds or debentures offered by Abundance are higher risk than the low risk councils loans which are backed by council revenues. 14 councils had used the platform by March 2025 as a way to raise funding from their citizens and the wider general public, and to raise awareness of the actions they are taking to help the transition to a low carbon economy.

It is a founding member of the sector’s trade association, the UK Crowdfunding Association.

== Council lending and risks ==
Abundance launched its first Community Municipal Investments in 2020 following a report in May 2019 published by the Bauman Institute at the University of Leeds, “Financing for Society, Assessing the Suitability of Crowdfunding for the Public Sector”. The report summarised findings from 6 case studies, 3 of them with UK local authorities. One of its key findings showed that crowdfunding could be used to generate civic engagement with local residents and the report presented ‘Community Municipal Bonds’ co-created with Abundance as the mechanism.

West Berkshire Council was the first of two councils to issue bonds in 2020 followed by Warrington Borough Council. Another 12 councils had used the platform since then by March 2025, using loans rather than bonds. Most recent loans have come from Bristol City Council allowing “residents to invest in climate action”, as well as from Hackney Council and Hammersmith & Fulham Council to fund a wide range of initiatives from sustainable urban drainage and biodiversity through to energy efficiency and green energy. Oxfordshire County Council invited people “to get involved in [its] plans to become a net zero organisation by 2030 and be a part of the journey for the whole county to become net zero by 2050.”

Since 2022, all loans on the platform comply with the Loan Market Association’s Green Loan Principles.

Lending to councils is low risk compared to many other types of investing because any borrowing is automatically secured against the borrowing council’s revenues. Councils cannot go bankrupt and must continue to service their debts even in times of financial difficulty.

== The website ==
Abundance operates solely through its online platform. Investors deposit funds online and select the councils or companies to invest in according to their preferences. Abundance was one of the first platforms to offer an Innovative Finance ISA.
