= The More Abundant Life =

Phrase used by Franklin D. Roosevelt

The More Abundant Life was a phrase of scriptural flavor used by the U.S. President Franklin D. Roosevelt in his address before the Inter-American Conference for the Maintenance of Peace in Buenos Aires, Argentina, December 1, 1936, to signify the improved living conditions and enlarged cultural and economic opportunities available to the whole world through the maintenance in the Western Hemisphere of constitutional representative government based on faith in God.

The phrase is taken from the saying of Jesus at John 10:10: "The thief cometh not, but for to steal, and to kill, and to destroy: I am come that they might have life, and that they might have it more abundantly." Roosevelt, an Episcopalian, would also have been familiar with a similar phrase used in the collect for the Fifth Sunday after the Epiphany in the Book of Common Prayer.

== See also ==
- Abundant life
