= Abondance Ski Valley =

Ski area in Haute-Savoie, France

- Company logo
- Interactive map of Abondance Ski Valley
- Location: Abondance valley, Haute-Savoie, Rhone-Alpes, France
- Trails: 17

Abondance Ski Valley is a mid-sized ski area in the Haute-Savoie region of France, near Châtel and La Chapelle d'Abondance.The resort has been open since at least 1964 and was closed in 2007, when the local council voted to shut down the area after 15 years of loss-making. The resort was reopened in 2009, when Gregory Lynn Sherwood, an American entrepreneur, made a deal with the local mayor to operate the ski area for the next 12 years.

== Location ==
Abondance Ski Valley is located in the Abondance Valley, in the Chablais Alps. The resort is one of 12 ski stations in the Portes du Soleil linked ski area, and is open to Portes du Soleil combined ticket holders, however it is not linked to any other resorts and a drive to La Chapelle d'Abondance or Châtel is required in order to access the rest of the Portes du Soleil.

== Closure ==
In 2007, the ski area received media attention after it was reported to have shut down due to global warming, the first ski area in the Alps to become a casualty of climate change. This did not turn out to be the case, however, as the ski area had been suffering from financial losses for a long time, and the notoriously poor 2006–07 ski season was the last straw; since reopening, Abondance has not had significant issues with snow compared to other low-altitude ski resorts.
