= Oskar Fehr =

German ophthalmologist (1871–1959)

Oskar Fehr (9 October 1871 – 1 August 1959) was a German ophthalmologist. Among his medical specialties were swimming pool conjunctivitis, tumours of the eye, and retinal detachment. He was an internationally renowned eye surgeon.

== Life ==
Fehr was born in Braunschweig to a Jewish family. He studied in Heidelberg, Berlin, and Kiel, receiving his doctorate at Heidelberg in 1897.

From 1897 to 1906, he was assistant physician at the eye clinic of Julius Hirschberg (1843–1925) in Berlin. From 1907, he was head physician at the department of eye diseases at the Rudolf Virchow Hospital. He received the title of professor in 1919. Besides his work in the hospital, he had a large private practice in the western part of Berlin, close to the Tiergarten.

In 1934, Fehr was forbidden to enter the clinic where he had worked for more than 25 years. He continued his private practice and operated in different nursing homes. When Jewish doctors were prohibited to treat gentiles in 1938, he was one of the few who were allowed to remain in practice as “Judenbehandler” (“Jew treater”). Fehr decided to emigrate with his family to the United Kingdom in 1939, and was assisted in this by Frank Foley. He attended the University of Edinburgh to prepare for the exams required for practice in the UK. After passing his exams in 1942/43, he began private practice in London in July 1943, continuing until 1955 when his second heart attack forced him to retire. He became a British citizen in 1947. He died in London on 1 August 1959.

== Sources ==
- Jokl A.: The life of Oscar FEHR. Am J Ophthalmol. 1962 Dec;54:1011-9.
- Amm M, Holubar K.: [Mementos of the Berlin-Jewish ophthalmologist Oskar Fehr (1871-1959)] Eine Spurensuche die in Wien begann: Der Berliner jüdische Augenartz Oskar Fehr (1871 – 1959) Wien Klin Wochenschr. 1999 Jun 18;111(12):488-91
