= Julius Fahr =

Canadian businessman, entrepreneur and philanthropist

Julius Fahr (1925–2003) was a Canadian businessman, entrepreneur and philanthropist.

== Early life ==
Fahr immigrated to Canada in 1951 following his studies at a teachers college where he majored in History and Languages, mastering five of them. Once in Canada he chose to shovel coal instead of accepting teaching jobs until he received a salesman position at BrettYoung Seed Company. Shortly after, Fahr became manager of the hatchery and part owner at the firm. During this time, Fahr started farming in East St. Paul in 1954.

== Career ==
In 1975 Brett Young Seed was sold to Mackenzie Seeds. With extra time on his hands, he became a member of the German Business Professional Association and held the position of President from 1976 to 1977, and a director at Hansa Credit Union.

Much later, Fahr took on the challenge brought to him to help establish a new Lutheran congregation in East St. Paul called Abundant Life Lutheran Church. In 1973, Fahr combined resources with four other gentlemen to start The Puratone Corporation now one of western Canada's largest hog operations. He encouraged and supported the company financially throughout its history and particularly during the challenging times. Fahr found a lot of satisfaction in seeing others succeed. Not only did he significantly invest in Puratone, but he also played an active role in ensuring that individual employees succeeded by providing them the financial resources needed to buy shares in the company, or even buy their shares back when they needed the money for other things.

Fahr was a silent partner in a number of business ventures and was active in his wider community.

== Main achievements ==
- 1952-1971 Brett-Young Seeds Ltd. Senior Partner, Secretary-Treasurer. Winnipeg, MB
- Co-Founder & Director of The Puratone Corporation. 1972-1999. Niverville, MB
- Founder and President Of Fahr's Farm Ltd. East St Paul, MB
- President of Triangle Farm Produce Ltd.
- Director of the Canadian Hatchery Federation.
- Director of Holy Family Nursing Home. Winnipeg, MB
- 1973-1975 Past-President of the German Canadian Business Professional Association.
- President of Hansa Credit Union. Winnipeg, MB
- Founder of the Fahr Family Companies. Winnipeg, MB
