= Sulfotransferase =

Class of enzymes which transfer a sulfo group (–SO3) between molecules

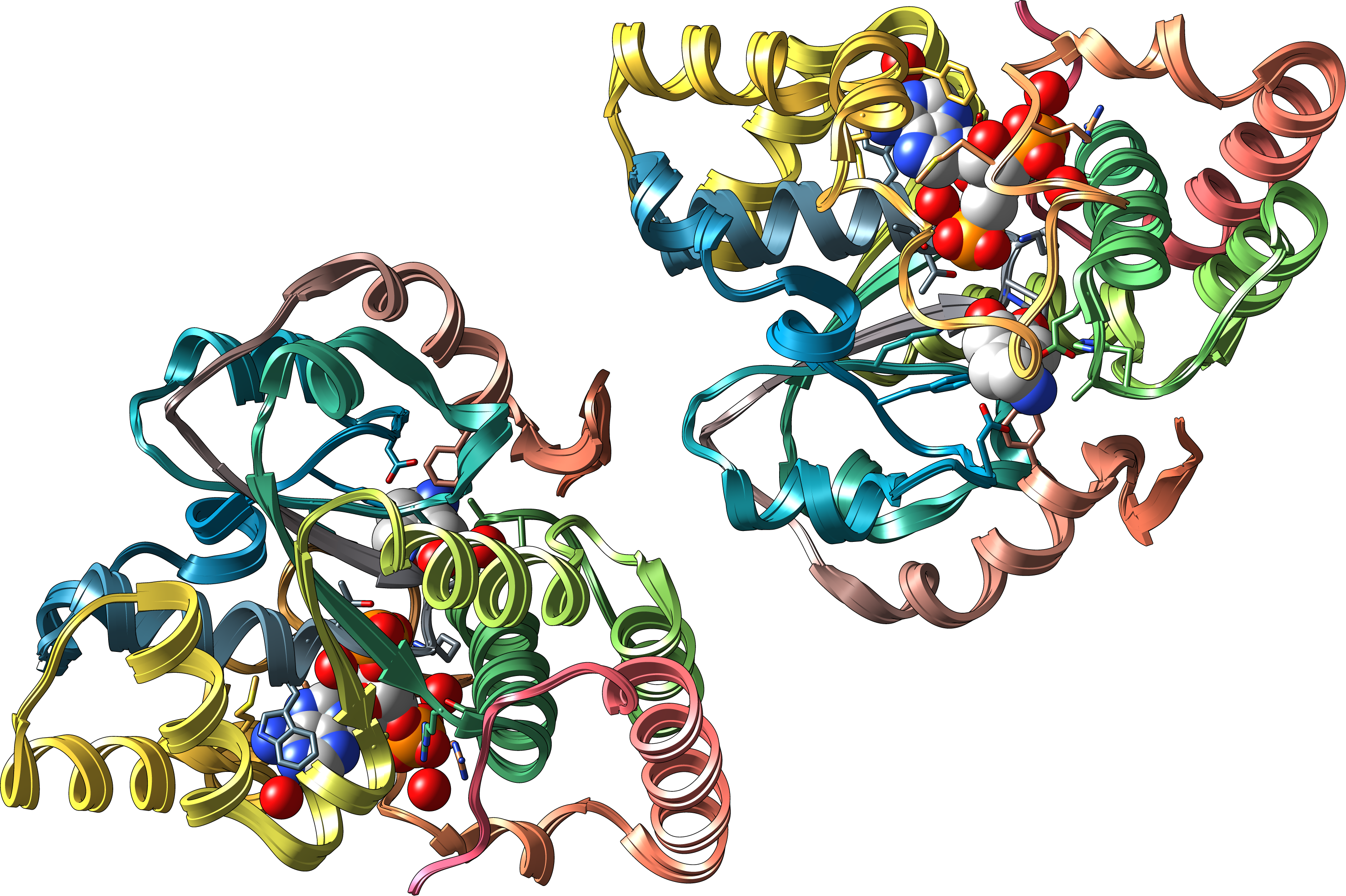
- Crystal Structure of Human Sulfotransferase SULT1A3 in Complex with Dopamine and 3-Phosphoadenosine 5-Phosphate

Identifiers
- EC no.: 2.8.2.-

Databases
- BRENDA: enzyme data
- ExPASy: NiceZyme view
- KEGG: enzyme entry
- MetaCyc: metabolic pathway
- Rhea: reactions
- PDB structures: RCSB PDB PDBe PDBsum
Search
- PMC: articles
- PubMed: articles
- NCBI: proteins

In biochemistry, sulfotransferases (SULTs) are transferase enzymes that catalyze the transfer of a sulfo group (R−SO^{−}_{3}) from a donor molecule to an acceptor alcohol (R−OH) or amine (R−NH_{2}). The most common sulfo group donor is 3'-phosphoadenosine-5'-phosphosulfate (PAPS). In the case of alcohol as acceptor, the product is a sulfate (R−OSO^{−}_{3}):

$$\ce{R-SO3-} \ + \ \ce{R'-OH} \quad \xrightarrow[\text{ SULT }]{} \quad \ce{R-H} \ + \ \ce{R'-OSO3-}$$

whereas an amine leads to a sulfamate (R−NH−SO^{−}_{3}):

$$\ce{R-SO3-} \ + \ \ce{R'-NH2} \quad \xrightarrow[\text{ SULT }]{} \quad \ce{R-H} \ + \ \ce{R'-NHSO3-}$$

Both reactive groups for a sulfonation via sulfotransferases may be part of a protein, lipid, carbohydrate, or steroid.

General structure of a sulfonic acid with the blue marked functional group

== Examples ==
The following are examples of sulfotransferases:

- carbohydrate sulfotransferase: CHST1, CHST2, CHST3, CHST4, CHST5, CHST6, CHST7, CHST8, CHST9, CHST10, CHST11, CHST12, CHST13, CHST14
- galactose-3-O-sulfotransferase: GAL3ST1, GAL3ST2, GAL3ST3, GAL3ST4
- heparan sulfate 2-O-sulfotransferase: HS2ST1
- heparan sulfate 3-O-sulfotransferase: HS3ST1, HS3ST2, HS3ST3A1, HS3ST3B1, HS3ST4, HS3ST5, HS3ST6
- heparan sulfate 6-O-sulfotransferase: HS6ST1, HS6ST2, HS6ST3
- N-deacetylase/N-sulfotransferase: NDST1, NDST2, NDST3, NDST4
- tyrosylprotein sulfotransferase: TPST1, TPST2
- uronyl-2-sulfotransferase
- Estrone sulfotransferase
- Chondroitin 4-sulfotransferase
- other: SULT1A1, SULT1A2, SULT1A3, SULT1A4, SULT1B1, SULT1C2, SULT1C3, SULT1C4, SULT1D1P, SULT1E1, SULT2A1, SULT2B1, SULT4A1, SULT6B1

== Mechanism and structure ==
The enzyme sulfotransferase catalyzes the sulfate transfer process with the use of 3'-phosphoadenosine-5'-phosphosulfate (PAPS), which is the form of the sulfate donor in its active state. Upon activation of the substrates for the catalysis, the substrate performs a nucleophilic attack on the sulfur atom from the sulfate group that has been transferred onto PAPS. This results in a transfer of the sulfate group and the creation of 3' phosphoadenosine-5-phosphate (PAP) as the products formed in the reaction. Kinetic and structural studies indicate that many sulfotransferases perform their catalysis via in-line nucleophilic substitution-like mechanism.

Many sulfotransferases possess conserved amino acid sequences or motifs, related to PAPS binding and catalytic activity. The central α/β fold of most cytosolic sulfotransferases contains a 5-stranded β-sheet running in a parallel fashion with surrounding α helix structures. Conserved residues within the active site help orient both the sulfate donor and the acceptor substrate, contributing to catalytic efficiency and substrate specificity.

Sulfotransferases are generally classified into cytosolic and membrane-associated forms. Cytosolic sulfotransferases participate primarily in the metabolism of hormones, neurotransmitters, xenobiotics, and drugs, whereas membrane-associated sulfotransferases localized in the Golgi apparatus are commonly involved in sulfation of carbohydrates, glycoproteins, and proteoglycans. Structural studies using X-ray crystallography have also provided insight into substrate recognition, conformational flexibility, and inhibitor binding among sulfotransferase families.

== See also ==
- List of EC numbers (EC 2)#EC 2.8.2: Sulfotransferases
- List of MeSH codes (D08)#MeSH D08.811.913.817 – sulfur group transferases (EC_2.8)
