= Galactose-3-O-sulfotransferase =

Identifiers
- Symbol: Gal-3-0_sulphotransfrase
- Pfam: PF06990
- InterPro: IPR009729
Available protein structures:
- PDB: IPR009729 PF06990 (ECOD; PDBsum)
- AlphaFold: IPR009729; PF06990

Galactose-3-O-sulfotransferases is a family of several mammalian galactose-3-O-sulfotransferase proteins. Gal-3-O-sulfotransferase is thought to play a critical role in 3'-sulfation of N-acetyllactosamine in both O- and N-glycans.

== Human proteins from this family ==
GAL3ST1; GAL3ST2; GAL3ST3; GAL3ST4; GP3ST;
