= Phenol sulfur transferase deficiency =

Metabolic disorder

Phenol sulfur transferase deficiency, in short PST deficiency, is the lack or the reduced activity of the functional enzyme phenol sulfur transferase, which is crucial in the detoxification of mainly phenolic compounds by catalysing the sulfate conjugation of the hydroxyl groups in the toxic phenolic compounds to result in more hydrophilic forms for more efficient excretion. This metabolic disorder was first discovered in the late 1990s by Dr. Rosemary Waring during her researches with autistic children, which also made this deficiency commonly associated to the topics of autism. Mutations in the PST genes account for the genetic causes of the deficiency, of which single nucleotide polymorphism and methylation of promoters are two examples of mutations that respectively cause conformational abnormalities and diminished expressions to the enzyme, resulting in the reduced detoxification of phenolic compounds and regulation of phenolic neurotransmitter. The deficiency may cause symptoms like flushing, tachycardia, and depression, and be a risk factor for disorders like autism, migraine, and cancer, while it also limits the use of phenolic drugs in PST deficient patients. There is currently no drug available for treating PST deficiency. However, some people suffering from PST deficiency have found taking a digestive enzyme supplement containing Xylanase 10 minutes before eating to greatly reduce symptoms.

== Phenol sulfur transferase ==
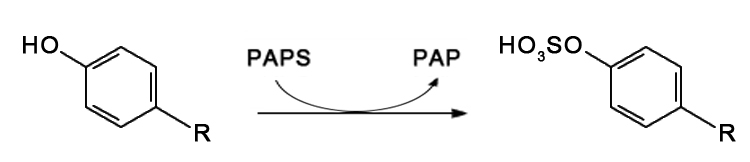
Sulfate conjugation catalyzed by PST, in which sulfuryl group from PAPS is transferred by PST to hydroxyl group of phenolic compounds.

Phenol sulfur transferase, in short PST or SULT1, is a subfamily of the enzyme cytosolic sulfotransferases (SULTs) consisting of at least 8 isoforms in humans that catalyze the transfer of sulfuryl group from 3′-phosphoadenosine 5′-phosphosulfate (PAPS) to phenolic compounds, resulting in more hydrophilic products that can be more easily expelled from tissues for excretion. At high concentration, PST could also catalyze the sulfate conjugation of amino groups. This enzyme subfamily, which exists in nearly all human tissues, is important for the detoxification of phenol-containing xenobiotics or endogenous compounds, including the biotransformation of neurotransmitters and drugs. Its expression is controlled by the PST genes located on chromosomes 2, 4, and 16 depending on the isoform, for example the genes for the predominant isoform throughout the body of human adults, SULT1A1, which is highly heritable and variable between individuals, and the most important one in the nervous system, SULT1A3, are located on chromosome 16 at the position of 16p11.2 to 16p12.1.

== Discovery ==
PST deficiency was first discovered in the late 1990s by Dr. Rosemary Waring through a series of tests during her researches on the mechanisms and characteristics of sulfation in autistic children. From the result of the test administering individuals with paracetamol, it was found that the level of sulfate conjugate in urine was significantly lower in the autistic individuals as compared to the non-autistic controls, which was caused by the decreased ability in the formation of sulfated metabolites. The level of sulfate in plasma was also found to be significantly lower in autistic children, leading to a reduced activity of PST. Therefore, she concluded that there was possibly a deficiency of PST in autistic children due to the reduction of sulfate in plasma as a substrate of PST.

== Pathophysiology ==
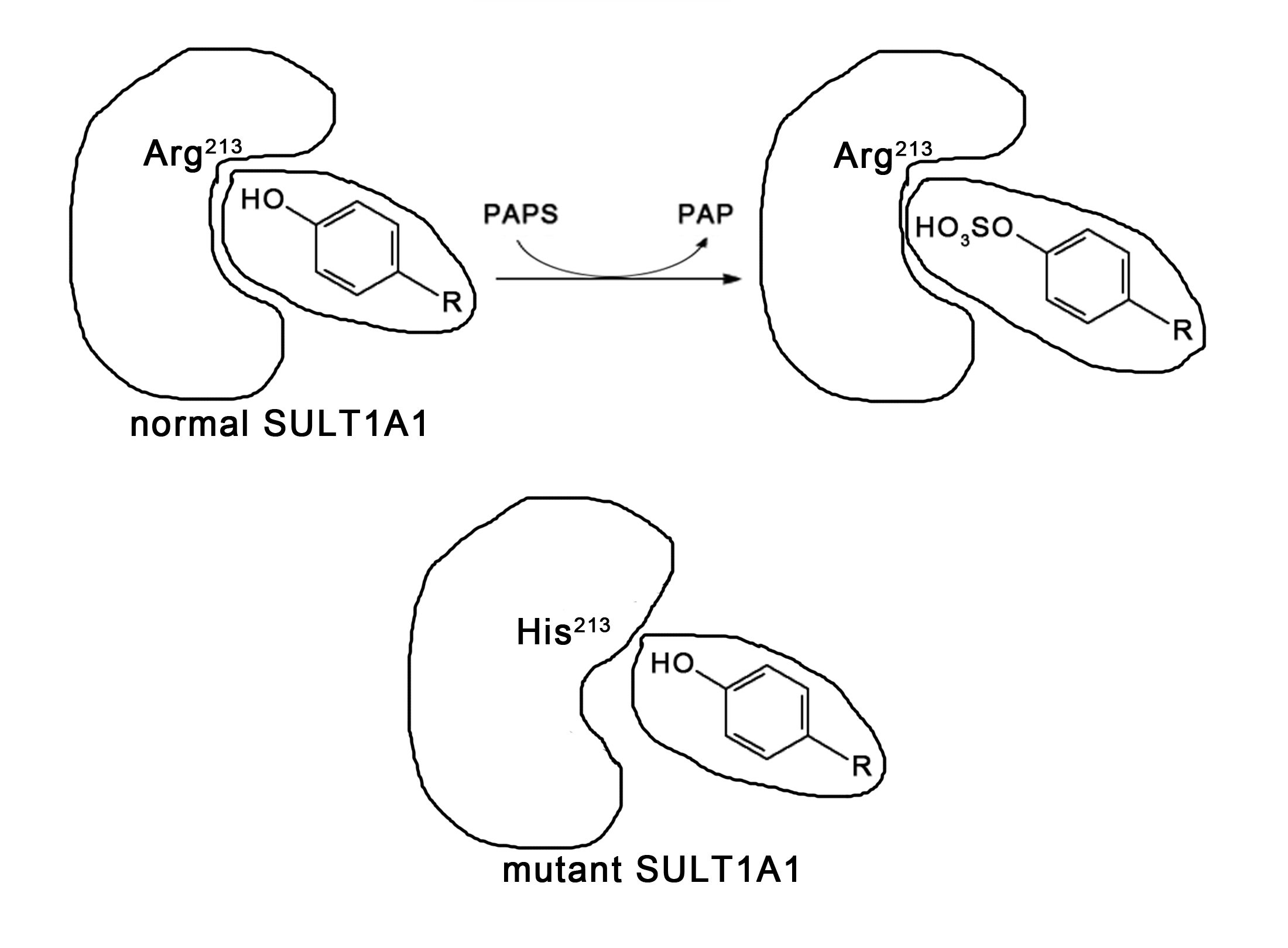
PST is a protein composed of long chain of amino acids in which the substitution of arginine by histidine at the position 213 due to the SULT1A1*2 polymorphism would cause the changes in biochemical properties and reduce the size of substrate binding site.

=== Causes ===
PST deficiency can be caused by inherited mutations in the PST genes, for example the SULT1A1*2 polymorphism, which is a single nucleotide polymorphism at the 638th base of the SULT1A1 gene from guanine to adenosine that causes the change of the 213th amino acid residue of the resultant SULT1A1 from arginine to histidine. This mutation causes a conformational change in the enzyme, reducing the size of the binding site and altering the thermochemical properties, which halves the substrate binding affinity and enzyme thermostability, and results in diminished enzymatic activity.

The methylation at the distal and proximal promoters of the PST gens is another mutation that accounts for the deficiency, which causes a reduction in PST expression rather than conformational abnormalities. This prevents the binding of RNA polymerase, which therefore inhibits the mRNA expression of the gene for the production of PST, and finally results in PST deficiency.

=== Disease-causing mechanisms ===
PST deficiency can directly cause diseases by the resulted phenol sulfoconjugation defect which reduces the removal of toxic phenolic compounds.

In the liver, where PST serves as one of the important enzymes involved in detoxification, the reduced transcriptional and translational levels of the PST genes would lead to the accumulation of phenolic xenobiotics and cause liver diseases like hepatic steatosis and cirrhosis, or even liver cancers like hepatocellular carcinoma when phenolic carcinogens are accumulated to trigger their developments.

In clinical neurochemistry, PST, in particular the SULT1A3 isoform, is responsible for the degradation of phenolic neurotransmitters such as dopamine and norepinephrine, and therefore is important in the regulation of neurotransmitters which would greatly affect neurological functions. Deficiency or down-regulation of SULT1A3 would cause the retention of neurotransmitter in synapses which affects brain functions including cognitive flexibility and associative learning.

== Clinical impact ==
=== Related disorders ===
Symptoms of PST deficiency are mainly resulted from the disruptions in multiple metabolic processes due to the accumulation of phenols in the body. Common symptoms include polydipsia, flushing, tachycardia, night sweats, and gastrointestinal problems such as diarrhoea. Neurological and psychiatric disorders such as depression may also occur when regulation of phenolic neurotransmitters is disrupted. PST deficiency is also a risk factor for various diseases including autism, migraine, and cancers.

==== Autism ====
It is suspected that mutations, including both microdeletion and microduplication, of the PST genes are the risk factors of autism spectrum disorder, especially the mutation causing decreased SULT1A activity which is usually reported in autistic individuals. Some studies have found that sulfotransferases like PST are involved in glycosylation, and therefore PST deficiency may cause impaired glycosylation, leading to dystroglycanopathies where severe abnormalities of the central nervous system including neuronal migration and cortical defects would occur, and finally result in autistic behaviours. However, it is still unclear on whether PST deficiency is a cause of autism, or just a biomarker for the disorder. Although recent researches have associated autism with the mutations in the position 16p11.2 on chromosome 16, where the gene of the predominant PST isoform in the nervous system SULT1A3 exists, due to the large number of gene in this region, PST deficiency resulted from the mutation there may not be a cause of autism but just a condition that is associated with the mutation of another gene which is causing autism.

==== Migraine ====
PST deficiency in platelets is a risk factor of migraine. It is believed that the reduced PST levels and activity raise the amount of unconjugated amines in the bloodstream and the central nervous system, resulting in a rise of catecholamine level which contributes to the occurrence of recurring headache in migraine. It is also found that dietary intake of foods that are rich in amines may further lower the activity of PST and trigger more serious migraine symptoms.

==== Cancers ====
It is controversial for whether PST deficiency increases or decreases the risk of cancers. Although one major function of PST is to inactivate phenolic carcinogens, and therefore a deficiency of PST would reduce inactivation of carcinogens and result in a higher risk of cancer, some studies have also found that PST, specifically SULT1A1, is responsible for the toxification of dietary and environmental mutagens which would increase the risk of cancer, and therefore a decreased risk may be associated with the deficient state of SULT1A1.

=== Pharmacological impacts ===
Drug metabolism of phenolic drugs, such as paracetamol and salicylamide, is greatly dependent on the phenol sulfoconjugation by PST, and therefore careful controls on the dosage forms, routes, rates, and duration of administration of those drugs are important for PST deficient patients to prevent accumulation of drugs in the body and depletion of PST for the sulfoconjugation of other xenobiotics and endogenous substances. High dosage of nonsteroidal anti-inflammatory drugs (NSAIDs), such as aspirin, would also cause a short term inhibition to the activity of PST, and should be administered to PST deficient patients with caution to prevent further reduction in PST activity and accumulation of phenolic compounds which would result in adverse impacts.
