= Phenol sulfotransferase =

Phenol sulfotransferase may refer to:

- SULT1A1, a human gene encoding a sulfotransferase
- SULT1A2, a human gene encoding a sulfotransferase
- SULT1A3, a human gene encoding a sulfotransferase
