= Arylsulfotransferase =

Arylsulfotransferase may refer to:

- Aryl sulfotransferase, an enzyme
- Aryl-sulfate sulfotransferase, an enzyme
