= Alcohol sulfotransferase =

Class of enzymes

Identifiers
- EC no.: 2.8.2.2
- CAS no.: 9032-76-2

Databases
- IntEnz: IntEnz view
- BRENDA: BRENDA entry
- ExPASy: NiceZyme view
- KEGG: KEGG entry
- MetaCyc: metabolic pathway
- PRIAM: profile
- PDB structures: RCSB PDB PDBe PDBsum
- Gene Ontology: AmiGO / QuickGO
Search
- PMC: articles
- PubMed: articles
- NCBI: proteins

Alcohol sulfotransferase is an enzyme that catalyzes the sulfate conjugation of primary and secondary alcohols including many hormones, neurotransmitters, drugs, and xenobiotic compounds.

The chemical reaction is:

an alcohol + 3'-phosphoadenylyl-sulfate $\rightleftharpoons$ adenosine 3',5'-bisphosphate + an organosulfate + H+

== Family members ==
Human genes that encode alcohol sulfotransferases include:

- SULT2A1
- SULT2B1
- SULT1C3

== See also ==
- sulfotransferase
