= SULT1C3 =

Protein-coding gene in the species Homo sapiens

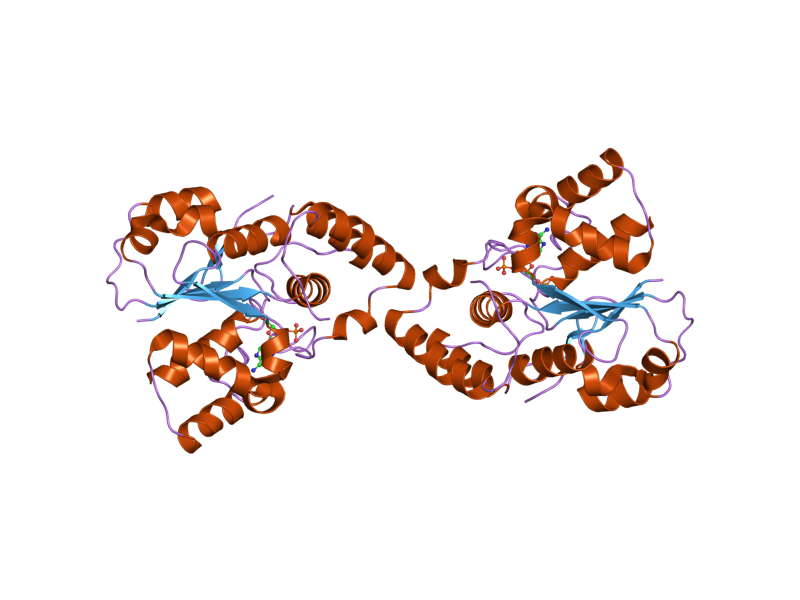

Identifiers
- Aliases: SULT1C3, ST1C3, sulfotransferase family 1C member 3
- External IDs: OMIM: 617151; MGI: 102928; GeneCards: SULT1C3
Available structures
PDB	Ortholog search: PDBe RCSB
PDB	List of PDB id codes 2H8K, 2REO
Enzyme activity
EC #	BRENDA	ExPASy	KEGG	MetaCyc
2.8.2.1	↗	↗	↗	↗
2.8.2.2	↗	↗	↗	↗

Gene location (Human)
Chr.	Chromosome 2 (human)
Band	2q12.3	Start	108,239,968 bp
Band	2q12.3	End	108,265,351 bp

Gene location (Mouse)
Chr.	Chromosome 17 (mouse)
Band	17 C|17 28.07 cM	Start	54,268,643 bp
Band	17 C|17 28.07 cM	End	54,297,702 bp
RNA expression pattern
Bgee	Human / Mouse (ortholog); Top expressed in: testicle; duodenum; mucosa of transverse colon; rectum; gastric mucosa; body of stomach; mucosa of esophagus; kidney; prostate; human kidney / Top expressed in: olfactory epithelium; retinal pigment epithelium; trachea; conjunctival fornix; zygote; secondary oocyte; submandibular gland; primary oocyte; sexually immature organism; hippocampal formation; More reference expression data
BioGPS	n/a
Gene ontology
Molecular function	alcohol sulfotransferase activity; aryl sulfotransferase activity; sulfotransferase activity; transferase activity
Cellular component	cytoplasm
Biological process	sulfur compound metabolic process
Sources:Amigo / QuickGO
Orthologs
Databases	NCBI: entry; OMA: entry
Species	Human	Mouse
Entrez	442038	20888
Ensembl	ENSG00000196228	ENSMUSG00000023943
UniProt	Q6IMI6	Q80VR3
RefSeq (mRNA)	NM_001008743; NM_001320878	NM_018751
RefSeq (protein)	NP_001008743; NP_001307807	NP_061221
Location (UCSC)	Chr 2: 108.24 – 108.27 Mb	Chr 17: 54.27 – 54.3 Mb
PubMed search
- Wikidata
View/Edit Human	View/Edit Mouse

Sulfotransferase 1C3, also known as ST1C3, is an enzyme that in humans is encoded by the SULT1C3 gene.

== Function ==
Sulfotransferase enzymes catalyze the sulfate conjugation of many hormones, neurotransmitters, drugs, and xenobiotic compounds. These cytosolic enzymes are different in their tissue distributions and substrate specificities. The gene structure (number and length of exons) is similar among family members.

== Clinical significance ==
ST1C3 sulfates large benzylic alcohols such as 1-hydroxymethyl-pyrene to chemically reactive mutagenic sulpho conjugates.

== See also ==
- Alcohol sulfotransferase
