= CFAP73 =

Protein found in humans

Identifiers
- Aliases: CFAP73, MIA2, CCDC42B, Coiled-coil domain containing 42B, cilia and flagella associated protein 73
- External IDs: MGI: 3779542; GeneCards: CFAP73

Gene location (Human)
Chr.	Chromosome 12 (human)
Band	12q24.13	Start	113,149,724 bp
Band	12q24.13	End	113,159,276 bp

Gene location (Mouse)
Chr.	Chromosome 5 (mouse)
Band	5 F|5	Start	120,766,400 bp
Band	5 F|5	End	120,772,300 bp
RNA expression pattern
Bgee	Human / Mouse (ortholog); Top expressed in: right uterine tube; olfactory zone of nasal mucosa; nasal epithelium; parotid gland; bronchial epithelial cell; Skeletal muscle tissue of rectus abdominis; biceps brachii; tendon of biceps brachii; caput epididymis; right ventricle / Top expressed in: spermatid; spermatocyte; testicle; hypothalamus; blastocyst; embryo; ovary; morula; lung; hippocampus proper; More reference expression data
BioGPS	n/a
Gene ontology
Molecular function	dynein complex binding
Cellular component	motile cilium; axonemal outer doublet; cytoplasm; cytoskeleton; cilium; cell projection
Biological process	inner dynein arm assembly; cilium movement
Sources:Amigo / QuickGO
Orthologs
Databases	NCBI: entry; OMA: entry
Species	Human	Mouse
Entrez	387885	546886
Ensembl	ENSG00000186710	ENSMUSG00000094282
UniProt	A6NFT4	J3QPZ5
RefSeq (mRNA)	NM_001144872	NM_001195094
RefSeq (protein)	NP_001138344	NP_001182023
Location (UCSC)	Chr 12: 113.15 – 113.16 Mb	Chr 5: 120.77 – 120.77 Mb
PubMed search
- Wikidata
View/Edit Human	View/Edit Mouse

Cilia- and flagella-associated protein 73, is a protein encoded by the protein-coding gene CFAP73 (previously CCDC42B). It is predicted that it is involved in regulating the movement of cilia and assembly of the inner dynein arm.

== Locus ==
CCDC42B gene is located on the plus strand of chromosome12 at position 24.13 of the long arm. CCDC42B gene starts at 113,587,663 base pairs and end at 113,597,081 base pairs. Part of CCDC42B overlaps with DDX54 gene (113,594,978-113,623,284). The size of CCDC42B is 9,419 bases and its molecular weight is 35,914 Da. CCDC42B mRNA contains 1514 bp and located from 113,587,663 to 113,597,081. CCDC42B protein contains 308 AA and located from 113,587,663 to 113,595,484. The promoter region (GXP_642107) contains 859 bp is predicted to be located from 113,586,906 to 113,587,764. Human CCDC42B gene has three neighbor gene: DDX54, RASAL 1, and DTX1.

DDX54 gene is member of DEAD protein family of Putative RNA helicases. The gene encodes DEAD box Protein which has a conserved motif of Asp-Glu-Ala-Asp (DEAD). The DEAD box protein family is associated with cellular processes that involve RNA secondary structure alteration such as RNA splicing, ribosome assembly, Initiation of translation, Nuclear and mitochondrial splicing, Spermatogenesis, embryogenesis, and cell growth and division. The RASAL 1 protein is member of GAP1 family that function in suppressing Ras function by inactivating GDP-bound form of Ras which permit the control of cellular proliferation and differentiation. DTX1 function as ubiquitin ligase protein by facilitating ubiquitination and allowing degradation of MEKK1. The ubiquitin ligase activity of DTX1 regulates the Notch Pathway, a signaling pathway that is associated with cell-cell communications that regulates cell-fate determination.

== Conservation ==
The Basic Alignment Search Tool (BLAST) of human CCDC42B protein-to-protein database including Mammalia for closely related species, and excluded Mammalia for distantly related species resulted in several orthologs species with reasonable E-value, and high, medium and low coverage depending on the relatedness of orthologs to human CCDC42B. Higher conservation of CCDC42B gene resulted in several strict orthologs (mammalian) of percentage identity range of 95%-53%: rhesus monkey, whale, pig, cattle, and mouse. Lower conservation of CCDC42B gene in distant homologs (non-mammalian) of percentage identity range of 23%-40%: Drosophila, reptile, amphibians and fish.

=== Paralogs ===
CCDC42B gene has only one major paralogs CCDC42'(CCDC42A)

Name	Species	Species common name	NCBI accession number	Length	Protein identity
CCDC42B	Homo sapiens	Human	NM_001144872.1	308aa	100%
CCDC42A	Homo sapiens	Human	NM_144681.2	316aa	36%

=== Orthologs ===
Human CCDC42B gene is found in ~58 orthologs species. CCDC42B higher conservation in many mammalian orthologs species compared to non-mammalian orthologs species. Higher conservation of CCDC42B gene in several strict orthologs (mammalian): chimpanzee, rhesus monkey, dog, cow, mouse, rat and chicken, and identities that range between 95%-69%. Lower conservation of CCDC42B gene in distant homologs (non-mammalian): birds, reptile, amphibians and fish and identities that range between 23%-40%. The figure shows comparison between strict orthologs and distant homologs for conservation of CCDC42B (purple color: matched amino acid residues; blue: conserved residues; pink: similar residues; white: different residues )

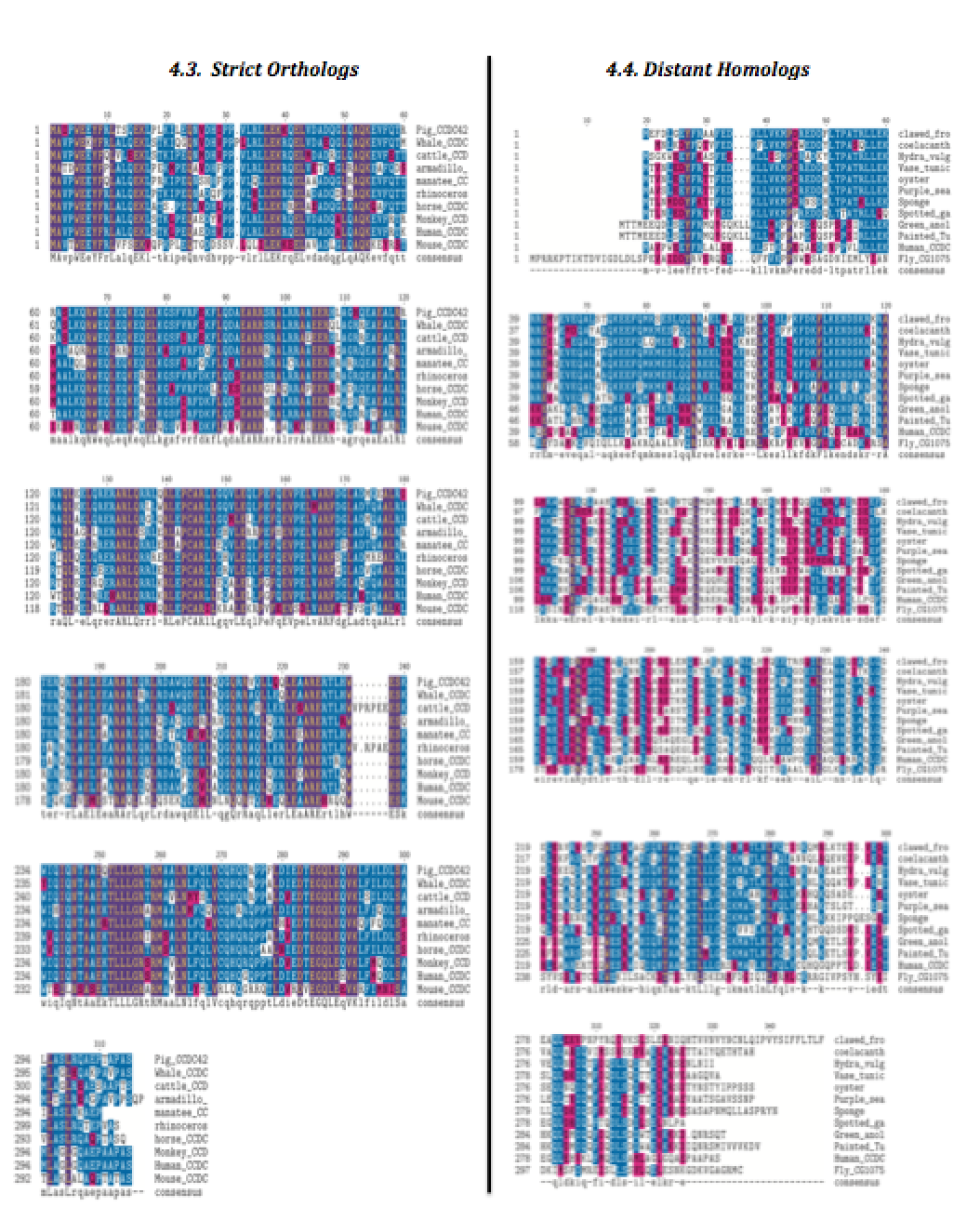
Strict orthologs vs. Distant Homologs for CCDC42B.

Genus/species	Common name	Class	MYA	Length (AA)	Identity	Accession(RefSeq)
Macaca mulatta	Rhesus monkey	Mammalia	29	308	95%	NP_001181192.1
Orcinus orca	Killer whale	Mammalia	94.2	309	81%	XM_004281459.1
Bos taurus	Cattle	Mammalia	94.2	314	79%	NM_001144873.1
Sus scrofa	Pig	Mammalia	94.2	308	79%	XM_005670689.1
Ceratotherium simum simum	Southern white rhinoceros	Mammalia	94.2	311	79%	XM_004430130.1
Loxodonta africana	African savanna elephant	Mammalia	98.7	303	79%	XM_003419288.1
Trichechus manatus latirostris	Florida manatee	Mammalia	98.7	303	78%	XM_004379058.1
Equus caballus	Horse	Mammalia	94.2	306	76%	
Dasypus novemcinctus	Nine-banded armadillo	Mammalia	104.2	310	74%	XM_004456157.1
Microtus ochrogaster	Prairie vole	Mammalia	92.3	308	69%	XM_005371872.1
Ciona intestinalis	Vase tunicate	Ascidiacea	722.5	308	40%	XM_002128423.1
Strongylocentrotus purpuratus	Purple sea urchin	Echinoidea	742.9	312	40%	
Xenopus (Silurana) tropicalis	Western clawed frog	Amphibia	371.2	326	38.7	XM_004910626.1
Crassostrea gigas	Pacific oyster	Bivalvia	782.7	312	38.2%	JH816130.1
Lepisosteus oculatus	Spotted gar	Bony fish	400.1	302	38%	XM_006640471.1
Hydra vulgaris	Fresh-water polyp	Hydrozoa	855.3	305	38%	XM_004206385.1
Chrysemys picta bellii	Western painted turtle	Reptilia	296	321	37%	XM_005309857.1
Anolis carolinesis	Green anole	Reptilia	296	314	36%	XM_003217075.1
Latimeria chalumnae	Coelacanth	bony fish	414.9	312	35%	XM_006005425.1
Amphimedon queenslandica	Sponge	demospongiae	716.5	319	33%	XM_003385188.1
Drosophila melanogaster	Fruit fly	Insecta	782.7	331	23%	NP_609955.1

=== Phylogeny ===
According to Biology Workbench, a phylogenetic tree was constructed showing the divergent of CCDC42B across species.The percent identity vs. the divergent time of orthologs species compared to human sequence is shown below. The figure illustrates the evolutionary history of CCDC42B gene in various species (shown in the orthologs space). The closely related species has higher percent identity, which provides statistical evidence for higher amino acids conservation.Distantly related species to human CCDC42B showed lower percent identity, which supports the few conservation of amino acid residue. The figure highlights the amount of changes occurred in CCDC42B evolution and rate of mutation in the gene.

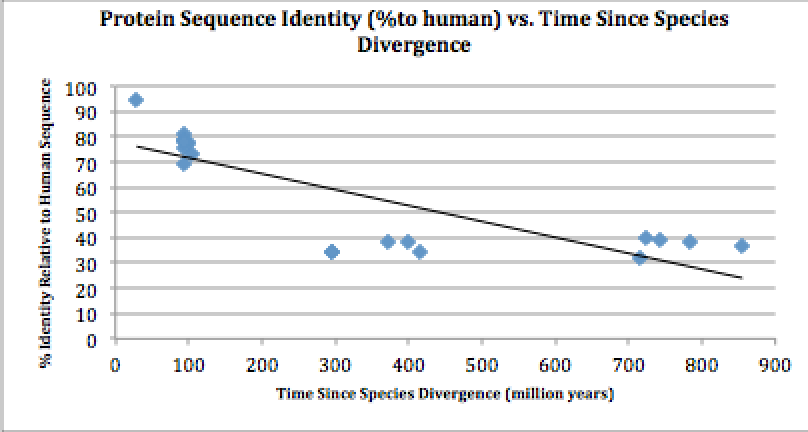
Divergence of CCDC42B across species.

== Protein ==
According to SAPS tool, Human CCDC42B protein is composed of 308 amino acids of 8 exons. The mature form of CCDC42B protein has molecular weight of 35.9 kdal (35,914 Da). The isoelectric point for human CCDC42B is 7.01, in which CCDC42B protein carries no net charge at that particular pH. The N-terminal of the protein sequence is composed of Met (M). The grand average of hydropathicity was predicted to be -0.694 for CCDC42B (Human) and -0.398 for Drosophila melanogaster CG10750, distantly related orthologs. The negative GRAVY confirms that both proteins are soluble and hydrophilic. The theoretical instability index (II) for CCDC42B is predicted to be 63.73 and for CG10750 is 45.20, which indicate that, both proteins are instable in a test tube. The half-life of is predicted to be 30 hours for both CCDC42B and CG10750 in mammalian reticulocytes (in vitro), which correspond to half-life for enzymes responsible for controlling metabolic rate. The above results confirmed that both CCDC42B and CG10750 share similarities in amino acid composition and protein characteristics. Thus, many characteristics of CCDC42B have been conserved across closely and distantly related species.

=== Primary sequence & variants/isoforms ===
Human CCDC42B gene contains 9 introns and 8 different mRNA transcripts are produced: 4 alternatively spliced variants and 4 un-spliced variants. Alternative splicing results in encoding 2 very good proteins, 3 good proteins and 3 non-coding proteins.

=== Domains and motifs ===
CCDC42B protein of unknown function contains coiled-coil domain of unknown function (DUF4200) that belongs to Eukaryote family and located at range of 34-159 amino acids. The DUF4200 domain has been conserved in Eukaryote. Coiled coil structure consists of two alpha helices wrapped around each other to form a twist. Heptad repeat pattern (abcdefg)n forms the sequence of coiled coil structure, where a and d are hydrophobic, e and g are polar of charged.

Tool	domains and motifs	Position (AA)
2ZIP	Leucine Zipper domain	123-154
2ZIP	coiled-coil	123-150 & 171-201
PFSCAN	Arginine-rich	94-139

=== Post-translational modifications ===
ExPASy Proteomics Tool was primarily used to analyze post-transcriptional modifications of CCDC42B protein. Human CCDC42B N-terminus Acetylation (A2) corresponded in 5 out of 6 orthologs. Drosophila has no Ala, Gly, Ser or Thr at position 1–3, thus N-terminus acetylation is conserved in human CCDC42B. Human CCDC42B protein has conserved SUMOylation site, since lysine (K) at position 285 was conserved in 5 out of 6 orthologs, mostly closely related organisms showed the conservation of lysine. Phosphorylation events occur mostly in CCDC42B, which is suggested to be involved in signaling pathways. Human CCDC42B phosphorylation site of tyrosine at position 8 (Y8) was fully conserved in all 6 orthologs species (the site corresponded with sulfation site). Also other phosphorylation sites in the human CCDC42B protein were conserved in the orthologs (illustrated in the multiple sequence alignment). The same amino acid residues in human CCDC42B protein are subjected to competing phosphorylation and O-linked glycosylation.However, glycosylation sites occur mostly in serine and threonine residues that would be phosphorylated by serine/ threonine kinases. Thus, phosphorylation of the Ser/Thr residues would prevent O-GlcNAc from processing. Human CCDC42B protein has conserved GPI-modification site of Alanine (A) at position 293 that was conserved in 4 out of 6 orthologs.

Post-Transcriptional Modification.

Tool	Predicted Modification	Homo sapiens	Mus musculus	Drosophila melanogaster
YinOYang	O-β-GlcNAc	T60, T240, S308	T302, T304, T306	S30, S116, T155, S238, S241
NetPhos	phosphorylation	S18, S80, T227, T277, Y8	S14, S58, S170, S188, S198, S238, S240, T4, T25, T59, T119, T167, T269	S19, S45, S116, S120, S141, S178, S201, S238, S241, S261, S290, S293, S308, S319, T7, T125, T132, Y239
Sulfinator	sulfation	(none)	(none)	Y61
SulfoSite	sulfation	Y8	Y56	Y61, Y294
SumoPlot	sumoylation	K289	K178, K287, K202, K53, K38, K39, K153	K9, K251, K232, K39, K328, K99
Terminator	N-terminus	A2	A2	P2

=== Secondary structure ===
CCDC42B protein form a secondary structure based upon alpha-helices. The structure of CCDC42B is predicted to contain several alpha-helices, and other random coils. Hairpin loop structures were detected at the 5'UTR and 3'UTR region of CCDC42B. Also, leucine zipper domain was found overlapping with coiled-coil domain. The attached image shows comparison between human CCDC42B and 5 other orthologs species which supports that human CCDC42B is primarily composed of alpha helices for its secondary structure.

=== 3° and 4° structure ===
According to CBLAST, the CCDC42B protein sequence was aligned with 2I1K_A (Chain A, Moesin From Spodoptera Frugiperda Reveals The Coiled-Coil Domain At 3.0 Angstrom Resolution), and an E-value of 1.00e-03 was obtained. The aligned sequences from 164 to 243 AA for CCDC42B, and 302-381 AA for 2I1K_A resulted in 22% identity between both sequences in 80 amino acid residues.The structure shows only the aligned sequence of CCDC42B with 2I1K_A. Predicted structure (blue: not similar residues, red: conserved residues, gray: not aligned CCDC42B residues with 2I1K_A).

== Expression ==
Human Protein atlas resulted in CCDC42B expression in normal human tissue. The expression level of CCDC42B gene in human normal tissues was detected at high to moderate level in 17 out of 78 tissues analyzed using Expressed Sequence Tag (EST) technique. CCDC42B gene has a narrowed expression in tissues. The gene has higher expression in respiratory epithelia and fallopian tube; Moderate expression in intestine and liver; and low to none expression in other normal tissues. Moreover, Microarray and Immunohistochemistry (IHC) expression detected presence of low level of CCDC42B mRNA expression in: salivary gland, stomach, skin, bone marrow, and lung. Coiled coil domain containing 42B is involved in cancer; CCDC42B gene is expressed in low to moderate level in tumor cell.

=== Promoter and Transcription Binding Factors ===
Promoter region for Human CCDC42B showing major Transcription Binding Factors.

According to Genomatix, the Promoter region contains 859 base pairs and it is located on the positive strand of chromosome 12 from region 113,586,906 to 113,587,764 upstream of CCDC42B gene. The promoter region was predicted to contain sites for transcription binding factors that regulate expression of CCDC42B. The Attached image illustrate important transcription binding factors in the promoter region for human CCDC42B .

=== Expression ===
CCDC42B gene has a narrowed expression in tissues. The gene has higher expression in respiratory epithelia and fallopian tube; Moderate expression in intestine and liver; low to none expression in other normal tissues. Coiled coil domain containing 42B is involved in some types of cancer. CCDC42B gene is expressed in low to moderate level in tumor cell.

== Function / Biochemistry ==
According to year 2014, CCDC42B gene/protein has unknown function in homo sapiens. However, Human CCDC42B is predicted to be involved in flagella assembly and motility.

== Interacting Proteins ==
According to STRING, MINT, and IntAct, Human CCDC42B did not show any direct interaction with other proteins. Searching GeneMania, other interactions have been identified by co-expression with other proteins as seen in the figure. CCDC42B was found to co-express with other coiled-coil domains containing proteins (CCDC78 and CCDC153). Since Human CCDC42B is expressed in low level in testis, it is predicted that human to interact with SPATC1 (Spermatogenesis and centriole associated 1).

== Clinical Significance ==
=== Disease Association ===
Human CCDC42B is located at chromosome 12 (12q24.13), which is linked to skeletal deformities, hypochondrogenesis, achondrogenesis, and kniest dysplasia. According to OMIM search chromosome 12 (12q24.1) is linked Noonan syndrome 1 that is caused by heterozygote mutation in PTPN11 gene product, SH-PTP2, and primarily causing facial developmental defects and heart defects.

=== Mutations ===
Two SNPs (Y8, Q280) are highly conserved in many orthologs species. Thus, these residues can change function of protein leading to possible disease not only in human.

SNP	Chromosome (12)	Position	Region of gene	Type	Allele change	Residue change
Rs61748300	113587667	2	CDS region	Missense (Non-synonymous)	GCG→GTG	Ala (A)→Val(V)
Rs373892417	113587685	8	CDS region	Missense (Non-synonymous)	TAT→TGT	Tyr (Y)→Cys (C)
Rs61738699	113589799	45	CDS region	Missense(Non-synonymous)	GCA→ACA	Ala (A)→Thr (T)
Rs377463846	113590594	57	CDS region	Missense(Non-synonymous)	CGC→ TGC	Arg(R) → Cys (C)
Rs34765757	113591023	94	CDS region	Frame shift	CGG→ G	Arg (R) → Gly (G)
Rs34276842	113591036	98	CDS region	Frame shift	GCG→ CG Ala	(A)→ Arg (R)
Rs370323183	113591110	122	CDS region	Missense(Non-synonymous)	CAG→CGG	Gln (Q) → Arg (R)
Rs34078446	113591152	138	CDS region	Frame shift	AAG→A	Lys (K)→ Ser (S)
Rs200344876	113592306	187	CDS region	Frame shift	→GGA	Glu (E) → Gly (G)
Rs377537662	113593122	250	CDS region	Missense(Non-synonymous)	CGC→TGC	Arg (R)→Cys (C)
RS144548708	113593212	280	CDS region	Missense(Non-synonymous)	CAG→GAG	Gln (Q)→Glu (E)

== Conceptual Translation ==
Major predicted domains, post-transcriptional modification sites, and structural form are shown in the conceptual translation

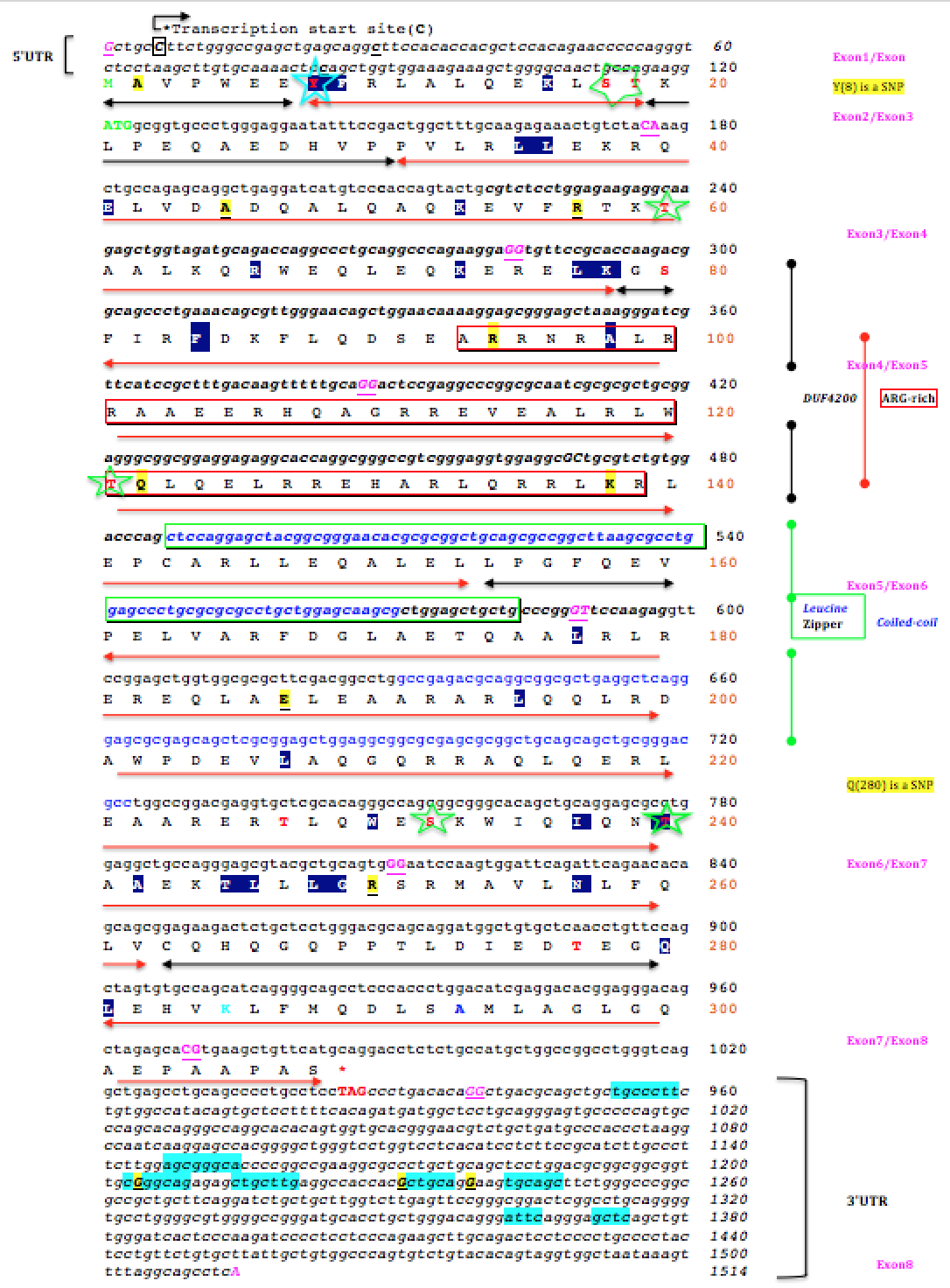
Conceptual Translation for CCDC42B.

Legends for conceptual translation.
