= Rosemary Waring =

British autism researcher

Rosemary Waring, an honorary Reader in human toxicology at the School of Biosciences, University of Birmingham, was the first researcher to produce scientific evidence suggestive of abnormal sulfur metabolism affecting people with autism spectrum disorders. Her findings suggest that people with autism present with consistently lower levels of circulating plasma sulfate and higher than normal levels of urinary sulfate than non-symptomatic controls (reflective of excessive 'dumping' of sulfate into the urine). Follow-up work has suggested that people with autism also present with higher than normal levels of other sulfur-related compounds, including sulfite.

Waring found that most people with autism conditions have a deficiency in a key detoxification pathway involved with sulfation. The enzyme involved is phenol sulfur-transferase (PST), which is essential to the process of breaking down and removing certain toxins from the body. Waring postulates that symptoms arise from an inadequate supply of usable sulfate ions, rather than from a deficiency of the metabolic enzyme itself.

== Select publications ==
- Waring R.H., Klovrza L.V., "Sulphur Metabolism in Autism". Journal of Nutritional and Environmental Medicine 10, 25–32 (2000)
- Kirk, C.J., Botomley, L., Minican, N., Carpenter, H., Shaw, S., Kohlik, N., Winter, M., Taylor, E.W., Waring, R.H., Michelangeli, F., Harris, R.M., "Environmental endocrine disruptors dysregulate estrogen metabolism and Ca2+ homeostasis in fish and mammals via receptor – independent mechanisms", Comp. Biochem. Physiol., 135, 1–8 (2003)
- Parsons, R.B., Smith, S.W., Waring, R.H., Williams, A.C. and Ramsden, D.B.‘Nicotinamide N-methyltransferase in a large scale cohort in the PD brain", Neuroscience Letters, 342 13–16 (2003)
- Parsons R.B., Smith., M-L., Williams, A.C., Waring, R.H. and Ramsden, D.B. "Expression of nicotinamide N-methyl transferase in the PD brain", J.Neuropath. Exper. Neurol. 61 111–124 (2002)
- Wilkinson, L.J. and Waring, R.H., "Cysteine dioxygenase: modulation of expression in human cell lines by cytokines with control of sulphate formation toxicology in vitro", 16 481–483 (2002)
