= CHST7 =

Protein-coding gene in humans

Identifiers
- Aliases: CHST7, C6ST-2, GST-5, carbohydrate sulfotransferase 7
- External IDs: OMIM: 300375; MGI: 1891767; GeneCards: CHST7
Enzyme activity
EC #	BRENDA	ExPASy	KEGG	MetaCyc
2.8.2.17	↗	↗	↗	↗

Gene location (Human)
Chr.	X chromosome (human)
Band	Xp11.3	Start	46,573,765 bp
Band	Xp11.3	End	46,598,496 bp

Gene location (Mouse)
Chr.	X chromosome (mouse)
Band	X|X A1.3	Start	19,925,799 bp
Band	X|X A1.3	End	19,963,760 bp
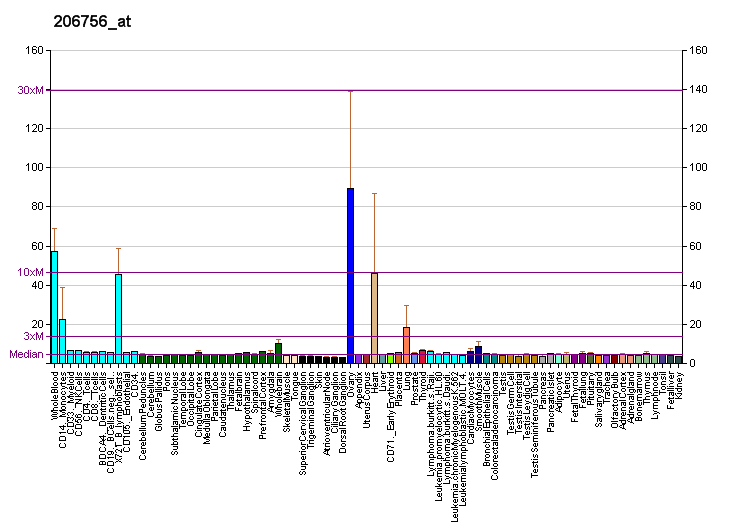
RNA expression pattern
Bgee	Human / Mouse (ortholog); Top expressed in: decidua; left ovary; right ovary; right auricle of heart; stromal cell of endometrium; testicle; left ventricle; canal of the cervix; left coronary artery; subcutaneous adipose tissue / Top expressed in: right kidney; primary oocyte; proximal tubule; primitive streak; interventricular septum; secondary oocyte; zygote; endothelial cell of lymphatic vessel; human kidney; embryo; More reference expression data
BioGPS	More reference expression data
Gene ontology
Molecular function	transferase activity; sulfotransferase activity; N-acetylglucosamine 6-O-sulfotransferase activity; chondroitin 6-sulfotransferase activity
Cellular component	integral component of membrane; Golgi membrane; Golgi apparatus; membrane; trans-Golgi network
Biological process	sulfur compound metabolic process; chondroitin sulfate biosynthetic process; N-acetylglucosamine metabolic process; polysaccharide metabolic process; carbohydrate metabolic process
Sources:Amigo / QuickGO
Orthologs
Databases	NCBI: entry; OMA: entry
Species	Human	Mouse
Entrez	56548	60322
Ensembl	ENSG00000147119	ENSMUSG00000037347
UniProt	Q9NS84	Q9EP78
RefSeq (mRNA)	NM_019886	NM_021715
RefSeq (protein)	NP_063939	NP_068361
Location (UCSC)	Chr X: 46.57 – 46.6 Mb	Chr X: 19.93 – 19.96 Mb
PubMed search
- Wikidata
View/Edit Human	View/Edit Mouse

Carbohydrate sulfotransferase 7 is an enzyme that in humans is encoded by the CHST7 gene.

== Function ==
This gene belongs to the sulfotransferase gene family. Sulfotransferases generate sulfated glycosaminoglycan (GAG) moieties during chondroitin sulfate biosynthesis. They create considerable structural diversity among chondroitin sulfates by transferring sulfate with remarkable specificity for the underlying oligosaccharide substrate. This gene product mainly transfers sulfate to N-acetylgalactosamine. The regulated expression of each member of this gene family may be an important determinant of sulfated GAGs expression and the associated function of chondroitin sulfates as regulators of many biologic processes. This gene is part of a gene cluster on chromosome Xp11.23.
