= SULT1C4 =

Protein-coding gene in the species Homo sapiens

Identifiers
- Aliases: SULT1C4, SULT1C, SULT1C2, sulfotransferase family 1C member 4
- External IDs: OMIM: 608357; GeneCards: SULT1C4
Available structures
PDB	Human UniProt search: PDBe RCSB
PDB	List of PDB id codes 2AD1, 2GWH
Enzyme activity
EC #	BRENDA	ExPASy	KEGG	MetaCyc
2.8.2.1	↗	↗	↗	↗

Gene location (Human)
Chr.	Chromosome 2 (human)
Band	2q12.3	Start	108,377,911 bp
Band	2q12.3	End	108,388,989 bp
RNA expression pattern
Bgee	Human / Mouse (ortholog); Top expressed in: ventricular zone; gallbladder; left ovary; right lung; ganglionic eminence; right ovary; right uterine tube; hypothalamus; canal of the cervix; caudate nucleus / n/a; More reference expression data
BioGPS	n/a
Gene ontology
Molecular function	transferase activity; sulfotransferase activity; aryl sulfotransferase activity
Cellular component	cytoplasm; cytosol; cellular component
Biological process	sulfation; ethanol catabolic process; 3'-phosphoadenosine 5'-phosphosulfate metabolic process
Sources:Amigo / QuickGO
Orthologs
Databases	NCBI: entry; OMA: entry
Species	Human	Mouse
Entrez	27233	n/a
Ensembl	ENSG00000198075	n/a
UniProt	O75897	n/a
RefSeq (mRNA)	NM_006588; NM_001321770	n/a
RefSeq (protein)	NP_001308699; NP_006579	n/a
Location (UCSC)	Chr 2: 108.38 – 108.39 Mb	n/a
PubMed search		n/a
- Wikidata
View/Edit Human

Sulfotransferase 1C4 is an enzyme that in humans is encoded by the SULT1C4 gene.

Sulfotransferase enzymes catalyze the sulfate conjugation of many hormones, neurotransmitters, drugs, and xenobiotic compounds. These cytosolic enzymes are different in their tissue distributions and substrate specificities.

The gene structure (number and length of exons) is similar among family members. This gene encodes a protein that belongs to the SULT1 subfamily, responsible for transferring a sulfo moiety from PAPS to phenol-containing compounds.
