= Carbohydrate (chondroitin 4) sulfotransferase 13 =

Protein found in humans

CHST13

Identifiers
- Aliases: CHST13, C4ST3, carbohydrate sulfotransferase 13, Carbohydrate (chondroitin 4) sulfotransferase 13
- External IDs: OMIM: 610124; MGI: 1919047; GeneCards: CHST13
Enzyme activity
EC #	BRENDA	ExPASy	KEGG	MetaCyc
2.8.2.5	↗	↗	↗	↗

Gene location (Human)
Chr.	Chromosome 3 (human)
Band	3q21.3	Start	126,524,155 bp
Band	3q21.3	End	126,543,291 bp

Gene location (Mouse)
Chr.	Chromosome 6 (mouse)
Band	6|6 D1	Start	90,285,331 bp
Band	6|6 D1	End	90,302,167 bp
RNA expression pattern
Bgee	Human / Mouse (ortholog); Top expressed in: testicle; right lobe of liver; granulocyte; monocyte; left testis; right testis; tibia; blood; mucosa of transverse colon; spleen / Top expressed in: granulocyte; embryo; yolk sac; bone marrow; liver; left lobe of liver; blastocyst; proximal tubule; calvaria; spermatocyte; More reference expression data
BioGPS	n/a
Gene ontology
Molecular function	transferase activity; N-acetylgalactosamine 4-O-sulfotransferase activity; sulfotransferase activity; chondroitin 4-sulfotransferase activity
Cellular component	integral component of membrane; Golgi membrane; Golgi apparatus; membrane
Biological process	chondroitin sulfate biosynthetic process; carbohydrate biosynthetic process; carbohydrate metabolic process; proteoglycan biosynthetic process
Sources:Amigo / QuickGO
Orthologs
Databases	NCBI: entry; OMA: entry
Species	Human	Mouse
Entrez	166012	71797
Ensembl	ENSG00000180767	ENSMUSG00000056643
UniProt	Q8NET6	D3Z6E3
RefSeq (mRNA)	NM_152889	NM_027928
RefSeq (protein)	NP_690849	NP_082204
Location (UCSC)	Chr 3: 126.52 – 126.54 Mb	Chr 6: 90.29 – 90.3 Mb
PubMed search
- Wikidata
View/Edit Human	View/Edit Mouse

Carbohydrate (chondroitin 4) sulfotransferase 13 is a protein that is encoded in humans by the CHST13 gene.

== Function ==
The protein encoded by this gene belongs to the sulfotransferase 2 family. It is localized to the golgi membrane, and catalyzes the transfer of sulfate to the C4 hydroxyl of beta-1,4-linked N-acetylgalactosamine (GalNAc) flanked by glucuronic acid residue in chondroitin. Chondroitin sulfate constitutes the predominant proteoglycan present in cartilage and is distributed on the surfaces of many cells and extracellular matrices.
