= Tyrosine sulfation =

Addition of a sulfate group to a tyrosine group in a protein

In biochemistry, tyrosine sulfation is a posttranslational modification where a sulfate group (−SO_{3}) is added to a tyrosine residue of a protein molecule. Secreted proteins and extracellular parts of membrane proteins that pass through the Golgi apparatus may be sulfated. Sulfation was first discovered by Bettelheim in bovine fibrinopeptide B in 1954 and later found to be present in animals and plants but not in prokaryotes or in yeast.

== Function ==
Sulfation plays a role in strengthening protein-protein interactions. Types of human proteins known to undergo tyrosine sulfation include adhesion molecules, G-protein-coupled receptors, coagulation factors, serine protease inhibitors, extracellular matrix proteins, and hormones. Tyrosine O-sulfate is a stable molecule and is excreted in urine in animals. No enzymatic mechanism of tyrosine sulfate desulfation is known to exist.

By knock-out of TPST genes in mice, it may be observed that tyrosine sulfation has effects on the growth of the mice, such as body weight, fecundity, and postnatal viability.

== Mechanism ==
Sulfation is catalyzed by tyrosylprotein sulfotransferase (TPST) in the Golgi apparatus. The reaction catalyzed by TPST is a transfer of sulfate from the universal sulfate donor 3'-phosphoadenosine-5'-phosphosulfate (PAPS) to the side-chain hydroxyl group of a tyrosine residue. Sulfation sites are tyrosine residues exposed on the surface of the protein typically surrounded by acidic residues; a detailed description of the characteristics of the sulfation site was available from PROSITE and predicted by an on-line tool named the Sulfinator. Two types of tyrosylprotein sulftotransferases (TPST-1 and TPST2) have been identified.

== Regulation ==
There is very limited evidence that the TPST genes are subject to transcriptional regulation and tyrosine O-sulfate is very stable and cannot be easily degraded by mammalian sulfatases. Tyrosine O-sulfation is an irreversible process in vivo.

== Clinical Significance ==
It has been shown that the sulfation of Tyr1680 in Factor VIII is essential for effective binding to vWF. Thus, when this is mutated, patients may suffer mild haemophiliac symptoms due to increased turnover. Sulfation of the three tyrosines found in human PSGL-1 not only enhance its binding to P-selectin but also enables its pH-selective binding to the immune checkpoint protein VISTA.

== Antibody for detection of tyrosine-sulfated epitopes ==
In 2006, an article was published in the Journal of Biological Chemistry describing the production and characterization of an antibody called PSG2. This antibody shows exquisite sensitivity and specificity for epitopes containing sulfotyrosine independent of the sequence context.
