= Heparan sulfate 2-O-sulfotransferase =

Identifiers
- Symbol: HS2ST
- Pfam: PF03567
- InterPro: IPR005331
Available protein structures:
- PDB: IPR005331 PF03567 (ECOD; PDBsum)
- AlphaFold: IPR005331; PF03567

Heparan sulfate 2-O-sulfotransferase is a sulfotransferase enzyme. Heparan sulfate (HS) is a long unbranched polysaccharide found covalently attached to various proteins at the cell surface and in the extracellular matrix, where it acts as a co-receptor for a number of growth factors, morphogens, and adhesion proteins. HS-O-sulfotransferase (Hs2st) occupies a critical position in the succession of enzymes responsible for the biosynthesis of HS, catalysing the transfer of sulfate to the C2-position of selected hexuronic acid residues within the nascent HS chain. Mice that lack HS2ST undergo developmental failure after midgestation, the most dramatic effect being the complete failure of kidney development. This family is related to InterPro: IPR005331.
