= Aryl sulfotransferase =

Class of enzymes

aryl sulfotransferase

Identifiers
- EC no.: 2.8.2.1
- CAS no.: 9026-09-9

Databases
- IntEnz: IntEnz view
- BRENDA: BRENDA entry
- ExPASy: NiceZyme view
- KEGG: KEGG entry
- MetaCyc: metabolic pathway
- PRIAM: profile
- PDB structures: RCSB PDB PDBe PDBsum
- Gene Ontology: AmiGO / QuickGO
Search
- PMC: articles
- PubMed: articles
- NCBI: proteins

Arylsulfotransferase

Identifiers
- Symbol: Arylsulfotransferase
- Pfam: PF05935
- InterPro: IPR010262
Available protein structures:
- Pfam: structures / ECOD
- PDB: RCSB PDB; PDBe; PDBj
- PDBsum: structure summary

An aryl sulfotransferase (EC 2.8.2.1) is an enzyme that transfers a sulfate group from phenolic sulfate esters to a phenolic acceptor substrate.

3'-phosphoadenylyl sulfate + a phenol $\rightleftharpoons$ adenosine 3',5'-bisphosphate + an aryl sulfate

Thus, the two substrates of this enzyme are 3'-phosphoadenylyl sulfate and phenol, whereas its two products are adenosine 3',5'-bisphosphate and aryl sulfate.

These enzymes are transferases, specifically the sulfotransferases, which transfer sulfur-containing groups. The systematic name of this enzyme class is 3'-phosphoadenylyl-sulfate:phenol sulfotransferase. Other names in common use include phenol sulfotransferase, sulfokinase, 1-naphthol phenol sulfotransferase, 2-naphtholsulfotransferase, 4-nitrocatechol sulfokinase, arylsulfotransferase, dopamine sulfotransferase, p-nitrophenol sulfotransferase, phenol sulfokinase, ritodrine sulfotransferase, and PST. This enzyme participates in sulfur metabolism.

== Structural studies ==
As of late 2007, 5 structures have been solved for this class of enzymes, with PDB accession codes 1LS6, 1Z28, 1Z29, 2A3R, and 2D06.
