= HS2ST1 =

Enzyme

Identifiers
- Aliases: HS2ST1, dJ604K5.2, heparan sulfate 2-O-sulfotransferase 1, NFSRA
- External IDs: OMIM: 604844; MGI: 1346049; GeneCards: HS2ST1

Gene location (Human)
Chr.	Chromosome 1 (human)
Band	1p22.3	Start	86,914,635 bp
Band	1p22.3	End	87,109,982 bp

Gene location (Mouse)
Chr.	Chromosome 3 (mouse)
Band	3|3 H2	Start	144,135,467 bp
Band	3|3 H2	End	144,275,942 bp
RNA expression pattern
Bgee	Human / Mouse (ortholog); Top expressed in: buccal mucosa cell; germinal epithelium; endothelial cell; right adrenal cortex; left adrenal gland; Epithelium of choroid plexus; left adrenal cortex; ventricular zone; stromal cell of endometrium; retinal pigment epithelium / Top expressed in: right lung; left lung; right lung lobe; left lung lobe; medial ganglionic eminence; endothelial cell of lymphatic vessel; vestibular sensory epithelium; ciliary body; secondary oocyte; iris; More reference expression data
BioGPS	n/a
Gene ontology
Molecular function	transferase activity; sulfotransferase activity; heparan sulfate 2-O-sulfotransferase activity
Cellular component	integral component of membrane; Golgi membrane; Golgi apparatus; membrane
Biological process	glycosaminoglycan biosynthetic process; heparan sulfate proteoglycan biosynthetic process, polysaccharide chain biosynthetic process; heparan sulfate proteoglycan biosynthetic process, enzymatic modification
Sources:Amigo / QuickGO
Orthologs
Databases	NCBI: entry; OMA: entry
Species	Human	Mouse
Entrez	9653	23908
Ensembl	ENSG00000153936	ENSMUSG00000040151
UniProt	Q7LGA3	Q8R3H7
RefSeq (mRNA)	NM_012262; NM_001134492	NM_011828; NM_001355234
RefSeq (protein)	NP_001127964; NP_036394	NP_035958; NP_001342163
Location (UCSC)	Chr 1: 86.91 – 87.11 Mb	Chr 3: 144.14 – 144.28 Mb
PubMed search
- Wikidata
View/Edit Human	View/Edit Mouse

Heparan sulfate 2-O-sulfotransferase 1 is an enzyme that in humans is encoded by the HS2ST1 gene.

Heparan sulfate biosynthetic enzymes are key components in generating a myriad of distinct heparan sulfate fine structures that carry out multiple biologic activities. This gene encodes heparan sulfate 2-O-sulfotransferase, a member of the heparan sulfate biosynthetic enzyme family. This family member transfers sulfate to the 2 position of the iduronic acid residue of heparan sulfate.

The disruption of this gene resulted in no kidney formation in knockout embryonic mice, indicating that the absence of this enzyme may interfere with the signaling required for kidney formation.
