= SULT1B1 =

Protein-coding gene in the species Homo sapiens

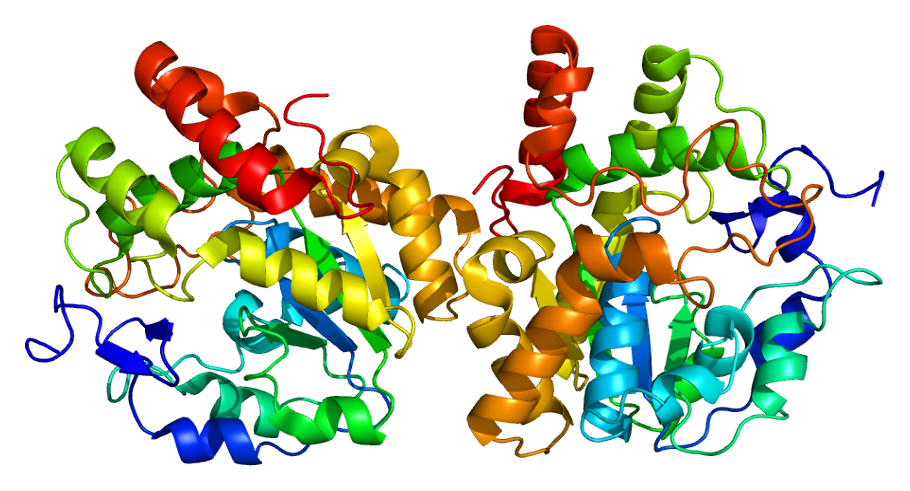

Identifiers
- Aliases: SULT1B1, ST1B1, ST1B2, SULT1B2, sulfotransferase family 1B member 1
- External IDs: OMIM: 608436; MGI: 2136282; GeneCards: SULT1B1
Available structures
| PDB | Ortholog search: PDBe RCSB |
| PDB | List of PDB id codes 2Z5F, 3CKL |
Enzyme activity
| EC # | BRENDA | ExPASy | KEGG | MetaCyc |
|---|---|---|---|---|
| 2.8.2.1 | ↗ | ↗ | ↗ | ↗ |

Gene location (Human)
| Chr. | Chromosome 4 (human) |
| Band | 4q13.3 | Start | 69,721,167 bp |
| Band | 4q13.3 | End | 69,787,961 bp |

Gene location (Mouse)
| Chr. | Chromosome 5 (mouse) |
| Band | 5|5 E1 | Start | 87,661,198 bp |
| Band | 5|5 E1 | End | 87,686,054 bp |
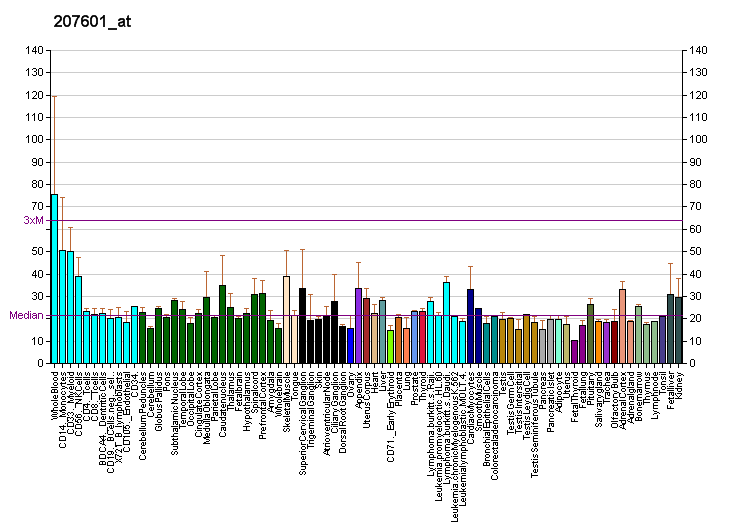
RNA expression pattern
| Bgee | Human / Mouse (ortholog); Top expressed in: rectum; mucosa of transverse colon; jejunal mucosa; duodenum; monocyte; epithelium of colon; mucosa of sigmoid colon; blood; mucosa of ileum; right lobe of liver / Top expressed in: duodenum; jejunum; colon; left colon; mucous cell of stomach; ileum; epithelium of stomach; pyloric antrum; epithelium of small intestine; intestinal villus; More reference expression data |
| BioGPS | More reference expression data |
Gene ontology
| Molecular function | transferase activity; sulfotransferase activity; protein binding; aryl sulfotransferase activity |
| Cellular component | cytoplasm; cytosol |
| Biological process | steroid metabolic process; phenol-containing compound metabolic process; epithelial cell differentiation; sulfation; lipid metabolism; cellular biogenic amine metabolic process; flavonoid metabolic process; thyroid hormone metabolic process; xenobiotic metabolic process; ethanol catabolic process; 3'-phosphoadenosine 5'-phosphosulfate metabolic process |
Sources:Amigo / QuickGO
Orthologs
| Databases | NCBI: entry; OMA: entry |
| Species | Human | Mouse |
| Entrez | 27284 | 56362 |
| Ensembl | ENSG00000173597 | ENSMUSG00000029269 |
| UniProt | O43704 | Q9QWG7 |
| RefSeq (mRNA) | NM_014465 | NM_019878; NM_001356943; NM_001382837 |
| RefSeq (protein) | NP_055280 | NP_063931; NP_001343872; NP_001369766 |
| Location (UCSC) | Chr 4: 69.72 – 69.79 Mb | Chr 5: 87.66 – 87.69 Mb |
| PubMed search |
- Wikidata
| View/Edit Human | View/Edit Mouse |

Sulfotransferase family cytosolic 1B member 1 is an enzyme that in humans is encoded by the SULT1B1 gene.

Sulfotransferase enzymes catalyze the sulfate conjugation of many hormones, neurotransmitters, drugs, and xenobiotic compounds. These cytosolic enzymes are different in their tissue distributions and substrate specificities. The gene structure (number and length of exons) is similar among family members. However, the total genomic length of this gene is greater than that of all of the other SULT1 genes.
