= HS6ST2 =

Protein-coding gene in humans

Identifiers
- Aliases: HS6ST2, heparan sulfate 6-O-sulfotransferase 2, MRXSPM
- External IDs: OMIM: 300545; MGI: 1354959; GeneCards: HS6ST2

Gene location (Human)
Chr.	X chromosome (human)
Band	Xq26.2	Start	132,626,015 bp
Band	Xq26.2	End	132,961,395 bp

Gene location (Mouse)
Chr.	X chromosome (mouse)
Band	X|X A5	Start	50,476,089 bp
Band	X|X A5	End	50,770,733 bp
RNA expression pattern
Bgee	Human / Mouse (ortholog); Top expressed in: endothelial cell; Brodmann area 23; lateral nuclear group of thalamus; renal medulla; testicle; middle temporal gyrus; placenta; ventricular zone; entorhinal cortex; Brodmann area 46 / Top expressed in: Epithelium of choroid plexus; lateral septal nucleus; Gonadal ridge; lateral hypothalamus; dorsomedial hypothalamic nucleus; calvaria; nucleus accumbens; habenula; dorsal striatum; superior colliculus; More reference expression data
BioGPS	n/a
Gene ontology
Molecular function	transferase activity; sulfotransferase activity; heparan sulfate 6-O-sulfotransferase activity
Cellular component	integral component of membrane; Golgi membrane; membrane; nucleoplasm
Biological process	heparan sulfate proteoglycan biosynthetic process, enzymatic modification; glycosaminoglycan biosynthetic process
Sources:Amigo / QuickGO
Orthologs
Databases	NCBI: entry; OMA: entry
Species	Human	Mouse
Entrez	90161	50786
Ensembl	ENSG00000171004	ENSMUSG00000062184
UniProt	Q96MM7	Q80UW0
RefSeq (mRNA)	NM_001077188; NM_147175; NM_001394073; NM_001394074; NM_147174	NM_001077202; NM_001290467; NM_001290468; NM_015819
RefSeq (protein)	NP_001070656; NP_671704	NP_001070670; NP_001277396; NP_001277397; NP_056634
Location (UCSC)	Chr X: 132.63 – 132.96 Mb	Chr X: 50.48 – 50.77 Mb
PubMed search
- Wikidata
View/Edit Human	View/Edit Mouse

Heparan sulfate 6-O-sulfotransferase 2 is an enzyme that in humans is encoded by the gene HS6ST2. As a heparan sulfate 6-O-sulfotransferase, this enzyme functions to transfer a sulfate group to heparan sulfate.

== Function ==
Heparan sulfate proteoglycans are ubiquitous components of the cell surface, extracellular matrix, and basement membranes, and interact with various ligands to influence cell growth, differentiation, adhesion, and migration.

This gene encodes a member of the heparan sulfate (HS) sulfotransferase gene family, which catalyze the transfer of sulfate to HS. Different family members and isoforms are thought to synthesize heparan sulfates with tissue-specific structures and functions. Multiple transcript variants encoding different isoforms have been found for this gene.
