= CHST4 =

Protein-coding gene in humans

Identifiers
- Aliases: CHST4, GST3, GlcNAc6ST2, HECGLCNAC6ST, LSST, carbohydrate sulfotransferase 4
- External IDs: MGI: 1349479; GeneCards: CHST4

Gene location (Human)
Chr.	Chromosome 16 (human)
Band	16q22.2	Start	71,525,233 bp
Band	16q22.2	End	71,538,748 bp

Gene location (Mouse)
Chr.	Chromosome 8 (mouse)
Band	8|8 D3	Start	110,755,785 bp
Band	8|8 D3	End	110,766,372 bp
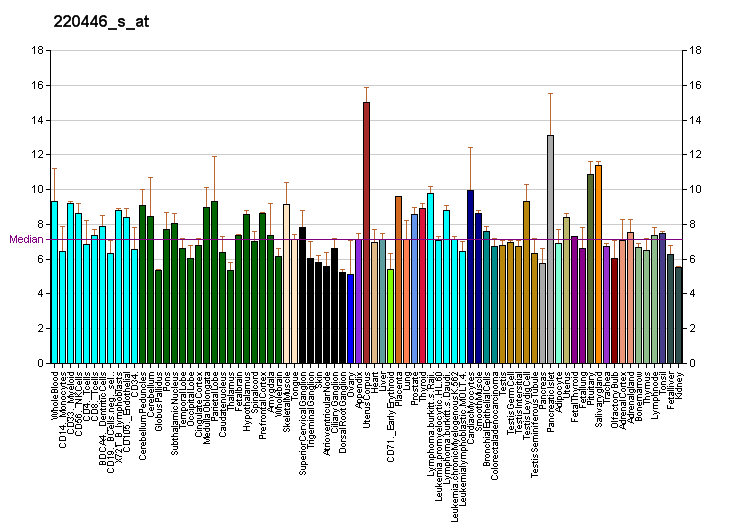
RNA expression pattern
Bgee	Human / Mouse (ortholog); Top expressed in: gallbladder; pancreatic ductal cell; testicle; islet of Langerhans; mucosa of ileum; body of pancreas; epithelium of bronchus; secondary oocyte; nasal epithelium; bronchial epithelial cell / Top expressed in: colon; left colon; duodenum; morula; urethra; jejunum; ileum; epithelium of stomach; intestinal villus; secondary oocyte; More reference expression data
BioGPS	More reference expression data
Gene ontology
Molecular function	transferase activity; sulfotransferase activity; N-acetylglucosamine 6-O-sulfotransferase activity
Cellular component	integral component of membrane; Golgi apparatus; intrinsic component of Golgi membrane; membrane; Golgi membrane; trans-Golgi network
Biological process	cell-cell signaling; cell adhesion; immune response; O-glycan processing; sulfur compound metabolic process; protein sulfation; inflammatory response; N-acetylglucosamine metabolic process; keratan sulfate biosynthetic process; carbohydrate metabolic process
Sources:Amigo / QuickGO
Orthologs
Databases	NCBI: entry; OMA: entry
Species	Human	Mouse
Entrez	10164	26887
Ensembl	ENSG00000140835	ENSMUSG00000035930
UniProt	Q8NCG5	Q9R1I1
RefSeq (mRNA)	NM_005769; NM_001166395	NM_011998
RefSeq (protein)	NP_001159867; NP_005760	NP_036128
Location (UCSC)	Chr 16: 71.53 – 71.54 Mb	Chr 8: 110.76 – 110.77 Mb
PubMed search
- Wikidata
View/Edit Human	View/Edit Mouse

Carbohydrate sulfotransferase 4 is an enzyme that in humans is encoded by the CHST4 gene.
