= CHST5 =

Protein-coding gene in humans

Identifiers
- Aliases: CHST5, I-GlcNAc-6-ST, I-GlcNAc6ST, glcNAc6ST-3, gn6st-3, hIGn6ST, carbohydrate sulfotransferase 5
- External IDs: OMIM: 604817; GeneCards: CHST5

Gene location (Human)
| Chr. | Chromosome 16 (human) |
| Band | 16q23.1 | Start | 75,528,530 bp |
| Band | 16q23.1 | End | 75,536,108 bp |
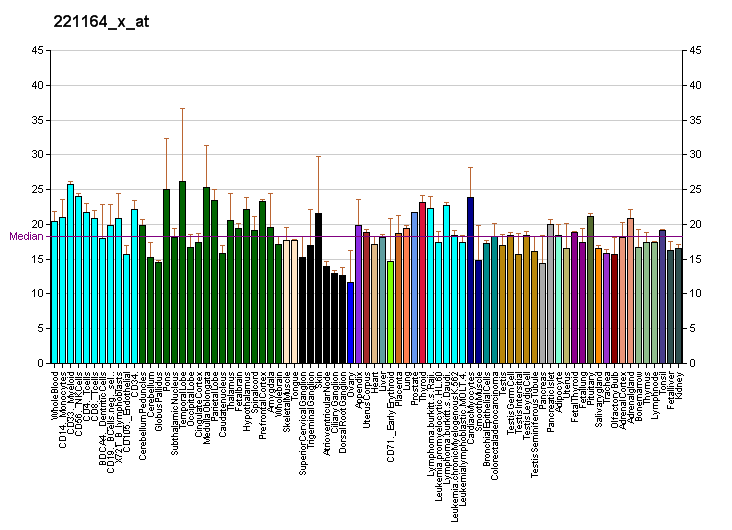
RNA expression pattern
| Bgee | Human / Mouse (ortholog); Top expressed in: duodenum; rectum; mucosa of transverse colon; right uterine tube; ventricular zone; gonad; cerebellum; cerebellar cortex; cerebellar hemisphere; right hemisphere of cerebellum / n/a; More reference expression data |
| BioGPS | More reference expression data |
Gene ontology
| Molecular function | transferase activity; sulfotransferase activity; N-acetylglucosamine 6-O-sulfotransferase activity |
| Cellular component | Golgi membrane; Golgi apparatus; intrinsic component of Golgi membrane; membrane; integral component of membrane; trans-Golgi network |
| Biological process | sulfur compound metabolic process; protein sulfation; keratan sulfate biosynthetic process; N-acetylglucosamine metabolic process; carbohydrate metabolic process |
Sources:Amigo / QuickGO
Orthologs
| Databases | NCBI: entry; OMA: entry |
| Species | Human | Mouse |
| Entrez | 23563 | n/a |
| Ensembl | ENSG00000135702 | n/a |
| UniProt | Q9GZS9 | n/a |
| RefSeq (mRNA) | NM_024533; NM_012126 | n/a |
| RefSeq (protein) | NP_078809 | n/a |
| Location (UCSC) | Chr 16: 75.53 – 75.54 Mb | n/a |
| PubMed search | | n/a |
- Wikidata
| View/Edit Human |

Carbohydrate sulfotransferase 5 is an enzyme that in humans is encoded by the CHST5 gene.
