= SULT1C2 =

Protein-coding gene in the species Homo sapiens

Identifiers
- Aliases: SULT1C2, ST1C1, ST1C2, SULT1C1, humSULTC2, sulfotransferase family 1C member 2
- External IDs: OMIM: 602385; MGI: 1916333; GeneCards: SULT1C2
Available structures
PDB	Ortholog search: PDBe RCSB
PDB	List of PDB id codes 3BFX
Enzyme activity
EC #	BRENDA	ExPASy	KEGG	MetaCyc
2.8.2.1	↗	↗	↗	↗

Gene location (Human)
Chr.	Chromosome 2 (human)
Band	2q12.3	Start	108,288,639 bp
Band	2q12.3	End	108,309,915 bp

Gene location (Mouse)
Chr.	Chromosome 17 (mouse)
Band	17|17 C	Start	54,136,665 bp
Band	17|17 C	End	54,153,367 bp
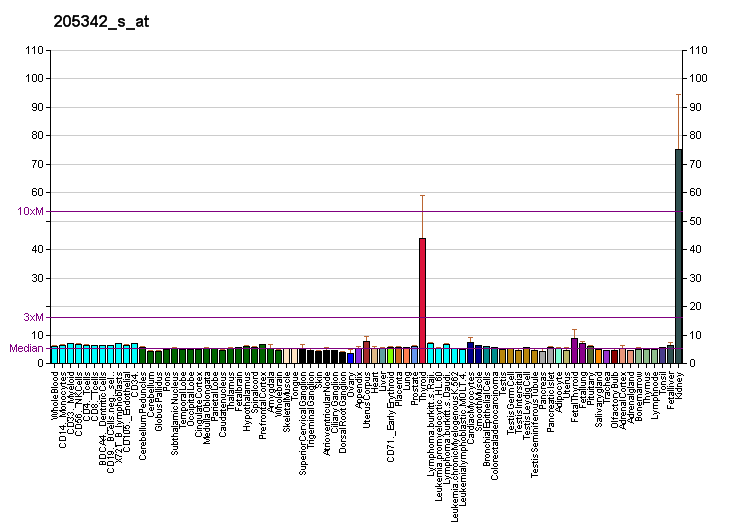

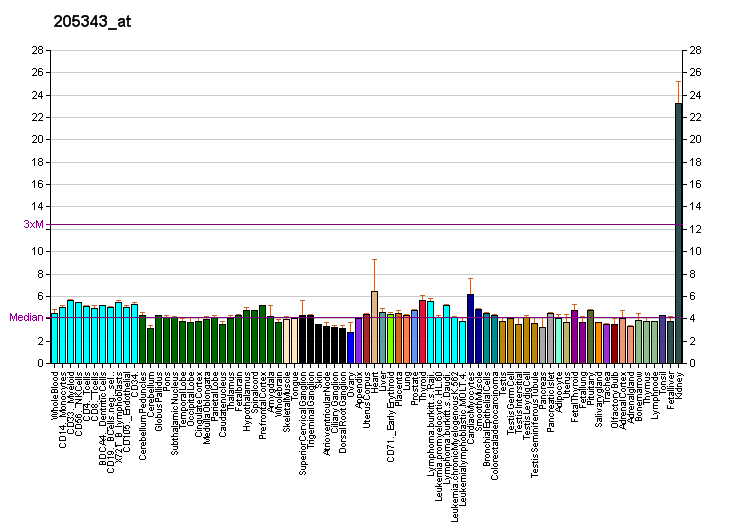

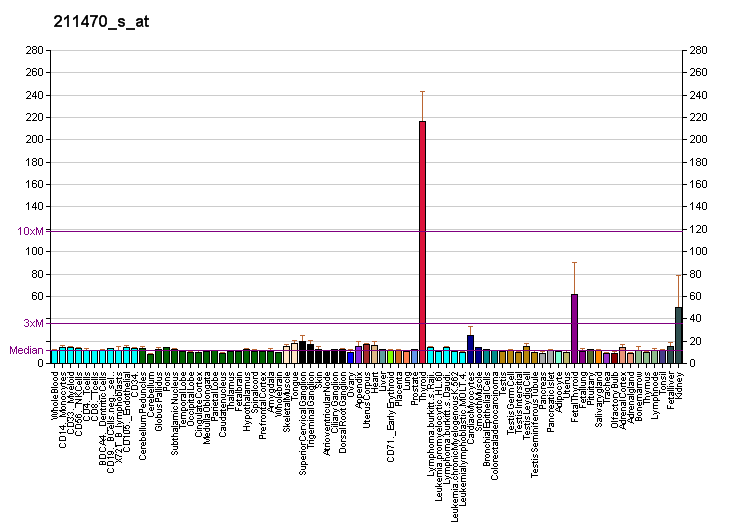
RNA expression pattern
Bgee	Human / Mouse (ortholog); Top expressed in: pylorus; kidney tubule; renal medulla; buccal mucosa cell; human kidney; gastric mucosa; glomerulus; corpus epididymis; metanephric glomerulus; caput epididymis / Top expressed in: epithelium of stomach; pyloric antrum; mucous cell of stomach; basilar part of occipital bone; right kidney; human kidney; rib; splanchnocranium; humerus; Meckel's cartilage; More reference expression data
BioGPS	More reference expression data
Gene ontology
Molecular function	transferase activity; sulfotransferase activity; protein binding; aryl sulfotransferase activity
Cellular component	cytoplasm; cytosol
Biological process	amine metabolic process; 3'-phosphoadenosine 5'-phosphosulfate metabolic process; sulfation
Sources:Amigo / QuickGO
Orthologs
Databases	NCBI: entry; OMA: entry
Species	Human	Mouse
Entrez	6819	69083
Ensembl	ENSG00000198203	ENSMUSG00000023122
UniProt	O00338	Q9D939
RefSeq (mRNA)	NM_001056; NM_176825	NM_026935
RefSeq (protein)	NP_001047; NP_789795	NP_081211
Location (UCSC)	Chr 2: 108.29 – 108.31 Mb	Chr 17: 54.14 – 54.15 Mb
PubMed search
- Wikidata
View/Edit Human	View/Edit Mouse

Sulfotransferase 1C2 is an enzyme that in humans is encoded by the SULT1C2 gene.

== Function ==
Sulfotransferase enzymes catalyze the sulfate conjugation of many hormones, neurotransmitters, drugs, and xenobiotic compounds. These cytosolic enzymes are different in their tissue distributions and substrate specificities. The gene structure (number and length of exons) is similar among family members. This gene encodes a protein that belongs to the SULT1 subfamily, responsible for transferring a sulfo moiety from PAPS to phenol-containing compounds. Two alternatively spliced transcript variants encoding different isoforms have been described for this gene.
