= Aryl-sulfate sulfotransferase =

Class of enzymes

arylsulfate sulfotransferase

Identifiers
- EC no.: 2.8.2.22
- CAS no.: 158254-86-5

Databases
- IntEnz: IntEnz view
- BRENDA: BRENDA entry
- ExPASy: NiceZyme view
- KEGG: KEGG entry
- MetaCyc: metabolic pathway
- PRIAM: profile
- PDB structures: RCSB PDB PDBe PDBsum
- Gene Ontology: AmiGO / QuickGO
Search
- PMC: articles
- PubMed: articles
- NCBI: proteins

In enzymology, an aryl-sulfate sulfotransferase (EC 2.8.2.22) is an enzyme that catalyzes the chemical reaction

an aryl sulfate + a phenol $\rightleftharpoons$ a phenol + an aryl sulfate

Thus, the two substrates of this enzyme are aryl sulfate and phenol, whereas its two products are phenol and aryl sulfate.

This enzyme belongs to the family of transferases, specifically the sulfotransferases, which transfer sulfur-containing groups. The systematic name of this enzyme class is aryl-sulfate:phenol sulfotransferase. Other names in common use include arylsulfate-phenol sulfotransferase, arylsulfotransferase, ASST, arylsulfate sulfotransferase, and arylsulfate:phenol sulfotransferase.

== See also ==
- Phenol sulfur-transferase deficiency
