= SULT1A2 =

Protein-coding gene in the species Homo sapiens

Identifiers
- Aliases: SULT1A2, HAST4, P-PST, ST1A2, STP2, TSPST2, sulfotransferase family 1A member 2, P-PST 2
- External IDs: OMIM: 601292; MGI: 102896; GeneCards: SULT1A2
Available structures
PDB	Ortholog search: PDBe RCSB
PDB	List of PDB id codes 1Z29
Enzyme activity
EC #	BRENDA	ExPASy	KEGG	MetaCyc
2.8.2.1	↗	↗	↗	↗

Gene location (Human)
Chr.	Chromosome 16 (human)
Band	16p11.2	Start	28,591,943 bp
Band	16p11.2	End	28,597,050 bp

Gene location (Mouse)
Chr.	Chromosome 7 (mouse)
Band	7 F3|7 69.25 cM	Start	126,272,037 bp
Band	7 F3|7 69.25 cM	End	126,275,604 bp
RNA expression pattern
Bgee	Human / Mouse (ortholog); Top expressed in: duodenum; mucosa of transverse colon; right lobe of liver; rectum; testicle; right lobe of thyroid gland; left lobe of thyroid gland; upper lobe of left lung; right lung; spleen / Top expressed in: left lobe of liver; left colon; tunica adventitia of aorta; stroma of bone marrow; white adipose tissue; right lung lobe; intercostal muscle; subcutaneous adipose tissue; muscle of thigh; brown adipose tissue; More reference expression data
BioGPS	n/a
Gene ontology
Molecular function	transferase activity; sulfotransferase activity; flavonol 3-sulfotransferase activity; protein binding; aryl sulfotransferase activity
Cellular component	cytoplasm; cytosol
Biological process	steroid metabolic process; phenol-containing compound metabolic process; catecholamine metabolic process; sulfation; lipid metabolism; amine biosynthetic process; xenobiotic metabolic process; ethanol catabolic process; 3'-phosphoadenosine 5'-phosphosulfate metabolic process
Sources:Amigo / QuickGO
Orthologs
Databases	NCBI: entry; OMA: entry
Species	Human	Mouse
Entrez	6799	20887
Ensembl	ENSG00000197165	ENSMUSG00000030711
UniProt	P50226	P52840
RefSeq (mRNA)	NM_001054; NM_177528; NM_001363863	NM_133670
RefSeq (protein)	NP_001045; NP_803564; NP_001350792	n/a
Location (UCSC)	Chr 16: 28.59 – 28.6 Mb	Chr 7: 126.27 – 126.28 Mb
PubMed search
- Wikidata
View/Edit Human	View/Edit Mouse

Sulfotransferase 1A2 is an enzyme that in humans is encoded by the SULT1A2 gene.

Sulfotransferase enzymes catalyze the sulfate conjugation of many hormones, neurotransmitters, drugs, and xenobiotic compounds. These cytosolic enzymes are different in their tissue distributions and substrate specificities.

The gene structure (number and length of exons) is similar among family members. This gene encodes one of two phenol sulfotransferases with thermostable enzyme activity. Two alternatively spliced variants that encode the same protein have been described.
