= Chondroitin 4-sulfotransferase =

Class of enzymes

chondroitin 4-sulfotransferase

Identifiers
- EC no.: 2.8.2.5
- CAS no.: 83589-04-2

Databases
- IntEnz: IntEnz view
- BRENDA: BRENDA entry
- ExPASy: NiceZyme view
- KEGG: KEGG entry
- MetaCyc: metabolic pathway
- PRIAM: profile
- PDB structures: RCSB PDB PDBe PDBsum
- Gene Ontology: AmiGO / QuickGO
Search
- PMC: articles
- PubMed: articles
- NCBI: proteins

In enzymology, a chondroitin 4-sulfotransferase (EC 2.8.2.5) is an enzyme that catalyzes the chemical reaction

3'-phosphoadenosine-5'-phosphosulfate + chondroitin $\rightleftharpoons$ adenosine 3',5'-bisphosphate + chondroitin 4'-sulfate

Thus, the two substrates of this enzyme are 3'-phosphoadenylyl sulfate and chondroitin, whereas its two products are adenosine 3',5'-bisphosphate and chondroitin 4'-sulfate.

This enzyme belongs to the family of transferases, to be specific, the sulfotransferases, which transfer sulfur-containing groups. The systematic name of this enzyme class is 3'-phosphoadenylyl-sulfate:chondroitin 4'-sulfotransferase. This enzyme is also called chondroitin sulfotransferase. This enzyme participates in 3 metabolic pathways: chondroitin sulfate biosynthesis, sulfur metabolism, and the biosynthesis of glycan structures.
