= Heparan sulfate 6-O-sulfotransferase =

Family of enzymes

Heparan sulfate 6-sulfotransferase

Identifiers
- Symbol: HS6ST
- Pfam: PF03567
- InterPro: IPR005331
- Membranome: 497
Available protein structures:
- PDB: IPR005331 PF03567 (ECOD; PDBsum)
- AlphaFold: IPR005331; PF03567

Heparan sulfate 6-O-sulfotransferase 1

Identifiers
- Symbol: HS6ST1
- Alt. symbols: HS6ST
- NCBI gene: 9394
- HGNC: 5201
- OMIM: 604846
- RefSeq: NM_004807
- UniProt: O60243

Other data
- Locus: Chr. 2 q14.3
Search for
- Structures: Swiss-model
- Domains: InterPro

Heparan sulfate 6-O-sulfotransferase 2

Identifiers
- Symbol: HS6ST2
- NCBI gene: 90161
- HGNC: 19133
- OMIM: 300545
- RefSeq: NM_147174
- UniProt: Q96MM7

Other data
- Locus: Chr. X q26.2
Search for
- Structures: Swiss-model
- Domains: InterPro

Heparan sulfate 6-O-sulfotransferase 3

Identifiers
- Symbol: HS6ST3
- NCBI gene: 266722
- HGNC: 19134
- OMIM: 609401
- RefSeq: NM_153456
- UniProt: Q8IZP7

Other data
- Locus: Chr. 13 q32.1
Search for
- Structures: Swiss-model
- Domains: InterPro

Heparan sulfate 6-sulfotransferases are a family of enzymes that catalyse the transfer of sulfate from 3'-Phosphoadenosine-5'-phosphosulfate to the 6th position of the N-sulfoglucosamine residue in heparan sulfate. In particular, these enzymes catalyze the reaction (Rhea:56604):

alpha-D-glucosaminyl-[heparan sulfate](n) + 3'-phosphoadenylyl sulfate = 6-sulfo-alpha-D-glucosaminyl-[heparan sulfate](n) + adenosine 3',5'-bisphosphate + H^{+}

== Human isozymes ==
The different forms differ by the tissues with high expression:

- HS6ST1 – Fetal brain
- HS6ST2 – Brain, kidneys, ovaries
- HS6ST3 – Brain, blood vessels
