= NDST2 =

Enzyme

Identifiers
- Aliases: NDST2, HSST2, NST2, N-deacetylase/N-sulfotransferase 2, N-deacetylase and N-sulfotransferase 2, N-HSST 2
- External IDs: OMIM: 603268; MGI: 97040; GeneCards: NDST2
Enzyme activity
EC #	BRENDA	ExPASy	KEGG	MetaCyc
2.8.2.8	↗	↗	↗	↗

Gene location (Human)
Chr.	Chromosome 10 (human)
Band	10q22.2	Start	73,801,911 bp
Band	10q22.2	End	73,811,798 bp

Gene location (Mouse)
Chr.	Chromosome 14 (mouse)
Band	14|14 A3	Start	20,773,798 bp
Band	14|14 A3	End	20,784,630 bp
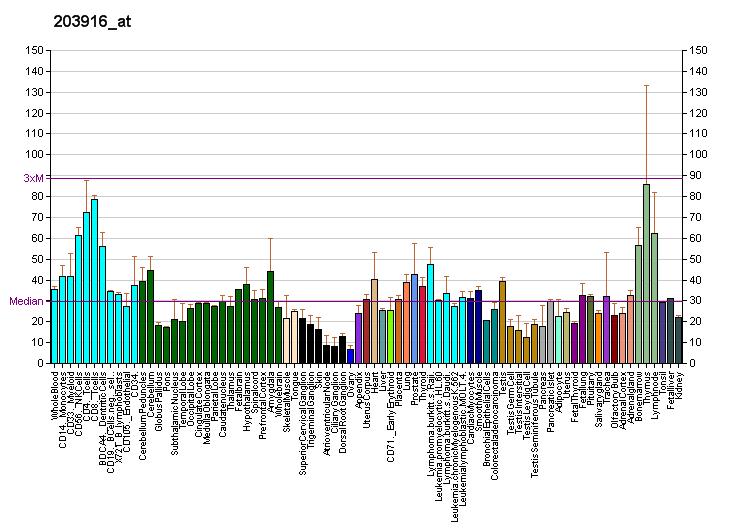
RNA expression pattern
Bgee	Human / Mouse (ortholog); Top expressed in: spleen; granulocyte; blood; bone marrow; tonsil; right hemisphere of cerebellum; gastric mucosa; minor salivary glands; sural nerve; appendix / Top expressed in: neural layer of retina; granulocyte; dermis; lip; ankle joint; ventricular zone; yolk sac; tail of embryo; spermatocyte; decidua; More reference expression data
BioGPS	More reference expression data
Gene ontology
Molecular function	transferase activity; sulfotransferase activity; catalytic activity; hydrolase activity; N-acetylglucosamine deacetylase activity; [heparan sulfate-glucosamine N-sulfotransferase activity]; deacetylase activity; heparan sulfate sulfotransferase activity; heparan sulfate N-acetylglucosaminyltransferase activity
Cellular component	integral component of membrane; Golgi membrane; Golgi apparatus; membrane
Biological process	metabolism; heparan sulfate proteoglycan biosynthetic process; heparin biosynthetic process; glycosaminoglycan biosynthetic process; regulation of angiotensin levels in blood; cellular process or phenomenon; sulfur compound metabolic process; heparan sulfate proteoglycan biosynthetic process, polysaccharide chain biosynthetic process
Sources:Amigo / QuickGO
Orthologs
Databases	NCBI: entry; OMA: entry
Species	Human	Mouse
Entrez	8509	17423
Ensembl	ENSG00000166507	ENSMUSG00000039308
UniProt	P52849	P52850
RefSeq (mRNA)	NM_001330107; NM_003635	NM_010811
RefSeq (protein)	NP_001317036; NP_003626	NP_034941
Location (UCSC)	Chr 10: 73.8 – 73.81 Mb	Chr 14: 20.77 – 20.78 Mb
PubMed search
- Wikidata
View/Edit Human	View/Edit Mouse

Bifunctional heparan sulfate N-deacetylase/N-sulfotransferase 2 is an enzyme that in humans is encoded by the NDST2 gene.
