= HS6ST1 =

Protein-coding gene found in humans

Identifiers
- Aliases: HS6ST1, HH15, HS6ST, heparan sulfate 6-O-sulfotransferase 1
- External IDs: OMIM: 604846; MGI: 1354958; GeneCards: HS6ST1

Gene location (Human)
Chr.	Chromosome 2 (human)
Band	2q14.3	Start	128,236,716 bp
Band	2q14.3	End	128,318,868 bp

Gene location (Mouse)
Chr.	Chromosome 1 (mouse)
Band	1|1 B	Start	36,107,481 bp
Band	1|1 B	End	36,145,527 bp
RNA expression pattern
Bgee	Human / Mouse (ortholog); Top expressed in: pancreatic ductal cell; ganglionic eminence; renal medulla; skin of arm; ventricular zone; right frontal lobe; postcentral gyrus; left adrenal cortex; right adrenal gland; middle temporal gyrus / Top expressed in: right kidney; middle ear; pharynx; Eustachian tube; muscle of thigh; lip; Gonadal ridge; left lobe of liver; proximal tubule; tooth; More reference expression data
BioGPS	n/a
Gene ontology
Molecular function	transferase activity; sulfotransferase activity; heparan sulfate 6-O-sulfotransferase activity
Cellular component	integral component of membrane; Golgi membrane; integral component of plasma membrane; membrane
Biological process	lung alveolus development; neuron development; labyrinthine layer blood vessel development; heparan sulfate proteoglycan biosynthetic process; angiogenesis; glycosaminoglycan biosynthetic process; heparan sulfate proteoglycan biosynthetic process, enzymatic modification
Sources:Amigo / QuickGO
Orthologs
Databases	NCBI: entry; OMA: entry
Species	Human	Mouse
Entrez	9394	50785
Ensembl	ENSG00000136720	ENSMUSG00000045216
UniProt	O60243	Q9QYK5
RefSeq (mRNA)	NM_004807	NM_015818
RefSeq (protein)	NP_004798	NP_056633
Location (UCSC)	Chr 2: 128.24 – 128.32 Mb	Chr 1: 36.11 – 36.15 Mb
PubMed search
- Wikidata
View/Edit Human	View/Edit Mouse

Heparan sulfate 6-O-sulfotransferase 1 (HS6ST-1) is an enzyme that in humans is encoded by the gene HS6ST1. This enzyme is one of three heparan sulfate 6-O-sulfotransferases reported in humans that transfer a sulfate from 3'-Phosphoadenosine-5'-phosphosulfate (PAPS) to heparan sulfate (specifically to position 6 of the N-sulfoglucosamine residue (GlcNS)).

These enzymes are located in the membrane of the golgi apparatus, and differ from each other by their tissue expression. HS6ST-1 has highest expression in the liver, though it is also has decent expression in the brain, heart, kidneys, and lungs. Notably, HS6ST-1 is important for neuronal development, potentially through regulation of neuron branching.

== Medical Significance ==
Variations in HS6ST1 have been associated with an increased susceptibility to hypogonadotropic hypogonadism, a disorder where those affected fail to reach sexual maturity during puberty. The HS6ST1-linked disorder has been designated hypogonadotropic hypogonadism-15 with or without anosmia (HH15), and may additionally require mutations in other genes such as FGFR1 or NELF.
