= GAL3ST1 =

Protein-coding gene in the species Homo sapiens

Identifiers
- Aliases: GAL3ST1, CST, galactose-3-O-sulfotransferase 1
- External IDs: OMIM: 602300; MGI: 1858277; GeneCards: GAL3ST1
Enzyme activity
EC #	BRENDA	ExPASy	KEGG	MetaCyc
2.8.2.11	↗	↗	↗	↗

Gene location (Human)
Chr.	Chromosome 22 (human)
Band	22q12.2	Start	30,554,635 bp
Band	22q12.2	End	30,574,665 bp

Gene location (Mouse)
Chr.	Chromosome 11 (mouse)
Band	11|11 A1	Start	3,933,636 bp
Band	11|11 A1	End	3,949,326 bp
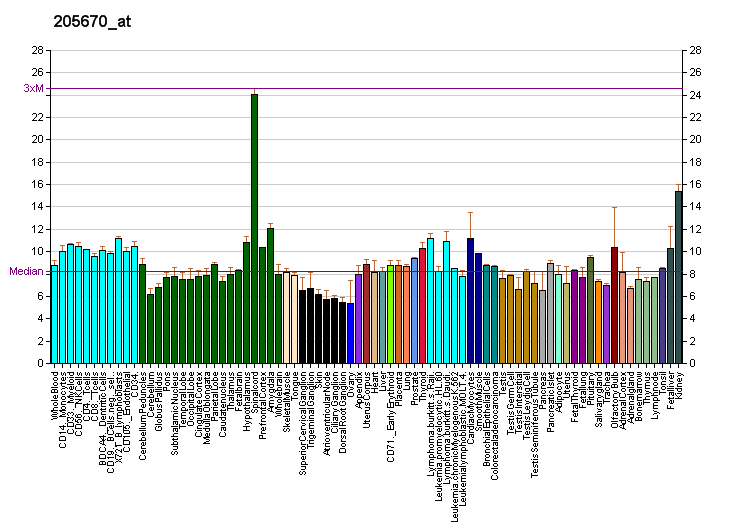
RNA expression pattern
Bgee	Human / Mouse (ortholog); Top expressed in: C1 segment; tibial nerve; gonad; putamen; duodenum; nucleus accumbens; amygdala; caudate nucleus; substantia nigra; sural nerve / Top expressed in: pyloric antrum; epithelium of stomach; mucous cell of stomach; right kidney; duodenum; lumbar subsegment of spinal cord; anterior horn of spinal cord; deep cerebellar nuclei; sciatic nerve; optic nerve; More reference expression data
BioGPS	More reference expression data
Gene ontology
Molecular function	transferase activity; sulfotransferase activity; galactosylceramide sulfotransferase activity
Cellular component	integral component of membrane; Golgi membrane; Golgi apparatus; integral component of plasma membrane; membrane
Biological process	glycolipid biosynthetic process; myelination; galactosylceramide biosynthetic process; protein N-linked glycosylation; spermatogenesis; sphingolipid metabolic process; lipid metabolism
Sources:Amigo / QuickGO
Orthologs
Databases	NCBI: entry; OMA: entry
Species	Human	Mouse
Entrez	9514	53897
Ensembl	ENSG00000128242	ENSMUSG00000049721
UniProt	Q99999	Q9JHE4
RefSeq (mRNA)	NM_004861; NM_001318103; NM_001318104; NM_001318105; NM_001318106 NM_001318107; NM_001318108; NM_001318109; NM_001318110; NM_001318111; NM_001318112; NM_001318113; NM_001318114; NM_001318115; NM_001318116	NM_001177691; NM_001177703; NM_016922; NM_001382290; NM_001382291
RefSeq (protein)	NP_001305032; NP_001305033; NP_001305034; NP_001305035; NP_001305036 NP_001305037; NP_001305038; NP_001305039; NP_001305040; NP_001305041; NP_001305042; NP_001305043; NP_001305044; NP_001305045; NP_004852	NP_001171162; NP_001171174; NP_058618; NP_001369219; NP_001369220
Location (UCSC)	Chr 22: 30.55 – 30.57 Mb	Chr 11: 3.93 – 3.95 Mb
PubMed search
- Wikidata
View/Edit Human	View/Edit Mouse

Galactosylceramide sulfotransferase is an enzyme that in humans is encoded by the GAL3ST1 gene.

Sulfonation, an important step in the metabolism of many drugs, xenobiotics, hormones, and neurotransmitters, is catalyzed by sulfotransferases. The product of this gene is galactosylceramide sulfotransferase which catalyzes the conversion between 3'-phosphoadenylylsulfate + a galactosylceramide to adenosine 3',5'-bisphosphate + galactosylceramide sulfate. Activity of this sulfotransferase is enhanced in renal cell carcinoma.
