= SULT1A3 =

Protein-coding gene in the species Homo sapiens

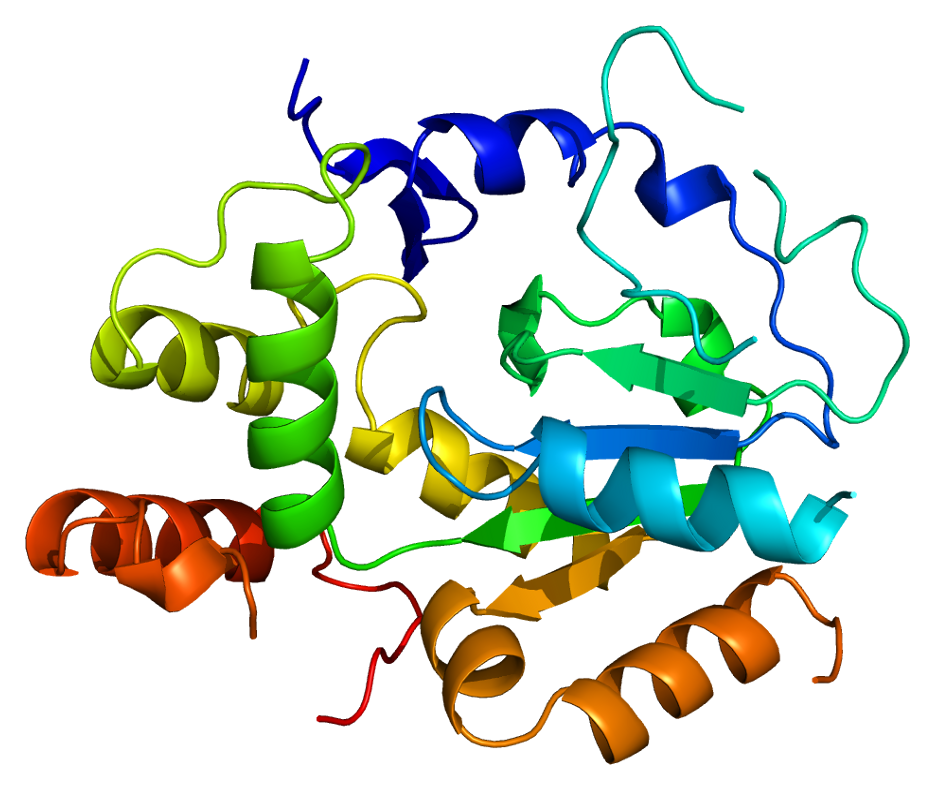

Identifiers
- Aliases: SULT1A3, HAST, HAST3, M-PST, ST1A3/ST1A4, ST1A5, STM, TL-PST, ST1A3, sulfotransferase family 1A member 3, ST1A4
- External IDs: OMIM: 600641; GeneCards: SULT1A3
Available structures
PDB	Human UniProt search: PDBe RCSB
PDB	List of PDB id codes 1CJM, 2A3R,%%s1CJM
Enzyme activity
EC #	BRENDA	ExPASy	KEGG	MetaCyc
2.8.2.1	↗	↗	↗	↗
2.8.2.1	↗	↗	↗	↗

Gene location (Human)
Chr.	Chromosome 16 (human)
Band	16p11.2	Start	30,199,228 bp
Band	16p11.2	End	30,204,310 bp
RNA expression pattern
Bgee	Human / Mouse (ortholog); Top expressed in: duodenum; mucosa of transverse colon; granulocyte; right hemisphere of cerebellum; spleen; rectum; right lobe of liver; right lobe of thyroid gland; pituitary gland; left lobe of thyroid gland / n/a; More reference expression data
BioGPS	n/a
Gene ontology
Molecular function	transferase activity; sulfotransferase activity; protein binding; aryl sulfotransferase activity; sulfate binding; amine sulfotransferase activity
Cellular component	cytoplasm; cytosol
Biological process	steroid metabolic process; IRE1-mediated unfolded protein response; catecholamine metabolic process; sulfation; lipid metabolism; flavonoid metabolic process; xenobiotic metabolic process; ethanol catabolic process; dopamine receptor signaling pathway; dopamine catabolic process; 3'-phosphoadenosine 5'-phosphosulfate metabolic process; ERK1 and ERK2 cascade; calcineurin-mediated signaling; NMDA selective glutamate receptor signaling pathway; negative regulation of neuron death; cellular response to dopamine
Sources:Amigo / QuickGO
Orthologs
Databases	NCBI: entry; OMA: entry
Species	Human	Mouse
Entrez	6818	n/a
Ensembl	ENSG00000261052	n/a
UniProt	P0DMM9; P0DMN0	n/a
RefSeq (mRNA)	NM_001017387; NM_003166; NM_177552	n/a
RefSeq (protein)	NP_808220; NP_001017390; NP_001017390.1; NP_808220.1; NP_001017390	n/a
Location (UCSC)	Chr 16: 30.2 – 30.2 Mb	n/a
PubMed search		n/a
- Wikidata
View/Edit Human

Sulfotransferase 1A3/1A4 is an enzyme that in humans is encoded by the SULT1A3 gene.

Sulfotransferase enzymes catalyze the sulfate conjugation of many hormones, neurotransmitters, drugs, and xenobiotic compounds. These cytosolic enzymes are different in their tissue distributions and substrate specificities. The gene structure (number and length of exons) is similar among family members. This gene encodes a phenol sulfotransferase with thermolabile enzyme activity. Four sulfotransferase genes are located on the p arm of chromosome 16; this gene and SULT1A4 arose from a segmental duplication. This gene is the most centromeric of the four sulfotransferase genes. Exons of this gene overlap with exons of a gene that encodes a protein containing GIY-YIG domains (GIYD1). Three alternatively spliced variants that encode the same protein have been described.
