= GAL3ST4 =

Protein-coding gene in the species Homo sapiens

Identifiers
- Aliases: GAL3ST4, GAL3ST-4, galactose-3-O-sulfotransferase 4
- External IDs: OMIM: 608235; MGI: 1916254; GeneCards: GAL3ST4

Gene location (Human)
Chr.	Chromosome 7 (human)
Band	7q22.1	Start	100,159,244 bp
Band	7q22.1	End	100,168,617 bp

Gene location (Mouse)
Chr.	Chromosome 5 (mouse)
Band	5|5 G2	Start	138,263,183 bp
Band	5|5 G2	End	138,271,102 bp
RNA expression pattern
Bgee	Human / Mouse (ortholog); Top expressed in: parotid gland; skin of abdomen; vulva; skin of leg; skin of thigh; thymus; nipple; ganglionic eminence; synovial membrane; endothelial cell / Top expressed in: lip; esophagus; zone of skin; embryo; embryo; granulocyte; blastocyst; striatum of neuraxis; epiblast; genital tubercle; More reference expression data
BioGPS	n/a
Gene ontology
Molecular function	galactose 3-O-sulfotransferase activity; transferase activity; galactosylceramide sulfotransferase activity; proteoglycan sulfotransferase activity; 3'-phosphoadenosine 5'-phosphosulfate binding
Cellular component	integral component of membrane; Golgi cisterna membrane; Golgi apparatus; extracellular exosome; membrane
Biological process	glycolipid biosynthetic process; sulfur compound metabolic process; cell-cell signaling; glycoprotein metabolic process; oligosaccharide metabolic process; proteoglycan biosynthetic process
Sources:Amigo / QuickGO
Orthologs
Databases	NCBI: entry; OMA: entry
Species	Human	Mouse
Entrez	79690	330217
Ensembl	ENSG00000197093	ENSMUSG00000075593
UniProt	Q96RP7	n/a
RefSeq (mRNA)	NM_024637	NM_001033416; NM_001347507; NM_001361283
RefSeq (protein)	NP_078913	n/a
Location (UCSC)	Chr 7: 100.16 – 100.17 Mb	Chr 5: 138.26 – 138.27 Mb
PubMed search
- Wikidata
View/Edit Human	View/Edit Mouse

Galactose-3-O-sulfotransferase 4 is an enzyme that in humans is encoded by the GAL3ST4 gene.

This gene encodes a member of the galactose-3-O-sulfotransferase protein family. The product of this gene catalyzes sulfonation by transferring a sulfate to the C-3' position of galactose residues in O-linked glycoproteins. This enzyme is highly specific for core 1 structures, with asialofetuin, Gal-beta-1,3-GalNAc and Gal-beta-1,3 (GlcNAc-beta-1,6)GalNAc being good substrates.

== Mutations ==
Pectus Excavatum, the most common deformity of the chest wall, is believed to have a genetic component. The condition is believed to be passed either dominantly or recessively by a gene of unknown identity. A study performed in 2012 by Wu et al. states that pectus excavatum displays dominant inheritance via a mutation in GAL3ST4. The study proposes mutation g.chr7: 99764688G>A affects the first exon of GAL3ST4 resulting in tryptophan replacing arginine at residue 11 of the encoded protein. This mutation is highly likely to disrupt the normal function of the encoded protein. GAL3ST4 is typically responsible for catalyzing “the C-3 sulfation of galactoses in O-linked glycoproteins”. Mutation of this gene results in alterations of the typical sulfation pattern of glycan chains, which will alter the physiologic functions of various glycoproteins. For normal development of cartilage and bone to occur, sulfation of proteoglycans must occur. Mutations of proteins responsible for other aspects of sulfation and sulfatases have been linked to several mutations affecting the skeleton. Through the evaluation of several participants with pectus excavatum, Wu et al. determined mutation of GAL3ST4 is most likely responsible for the dominant inheritance pattern of pectus excavatum through alterations of the encoded proteins.
