= GAL3ST3 =

Protein-coding gene in the species Homo sapiens

Identifiers
- Aliases: GAL3ST3, GAL3ST-3, GAL3ST2, galactose-3-O-sulfotransferase 3
- External IDs: OMIM: 608234; MGI: 3617843; GeneCards: GAL3ST3

Gene location (Human)
Chr.	Chromosome 11 (human)
Band	11q13.1	Start	66,040,765 bp
Band	11q13.1	End	66,049,161 bp

Gene location (Mouse)
Chr.	Chromosome 19 (mouse)
Band	19|19 A	Start	5,348,359 bp
Band	19|19 A	End	5,358,766 bp
RNA expression pattern
Bgee	Human / Mouse (ortholog); Top expressed in: gonad; left lobe of thyroid gland; right lobe of thyroid gland; caudate nucleus; putamen; right auricle of heart; nucleus accumbens; right hemisphere of cerebellum; right frontal lobe; prefrontal cortex / Top expressed in: hippocampus proper; primary visual cortex; striatum of neuraxis; superior frontal gyrus; dentate gyrus of hippocampal formation granule cell; cerebellum; cerebellar cortex; neural tube; mesencephalon; olfactory bulb; More reference expression data
BioGPS	n/a
Gene ontology
Molecular function	galactose 3-O-sulfotransferase activity; transferase activity; galactosylceramide sulfotransferase activity; proteoglycan sulfotransferase activity; 3'-phosphoadenosine 5'-phosphosulfate binding; carbohydrate binding
Cellular component	integral component of membrane; Golgi cisterna membrane; Golgi apparatus; membrane
Biological process	glycolipid biosynthetic process; sulfur compound metabolic process; poly-N-acetyllactosamine metabolic process; oligosaccharide metabolic process; proteoglycan biosynthetic process; monosaccharide metabolic process
Sources:Amigo / QuickGO
Orthologs
Databases	NCBI: entry; OMA: entry
Species	Human	Mouse
Entrez	89792	545276
Ensembl	ENSG00000175229	ENSMUSG00000047658
UniProt	Q96A11	P61315
RefSeq (mRNA)	NM_033036	NM_001024717
RefSeq (protein)	NP_149025	NP_001019888
Location (UCSC)	Chr 11: 66.04 – 66.05 Mb	Chr 19: 5.35 – 5.36 Mb
PubMed search
- Wikidata
View/Edit Human	View/Edit Mouse

Galactose-3-O-sulfotransferase 3 is an enzyme that in humans is encoded by the GAL3ST3 gene.

This gene encodes a member of the galactose-3-O-sulfotransferase protein family. The product of this gene catalyzes sulfonation by transferring a sulfate group to the 3' position of galactose in N-acetyllactosamine in both type 2 (Gal-beta-1-4GlcNAc-R) oligosaccharides and core-2-branched O-glycans, but not on type 1 or core-1-branched structures. This gene, which has also been referred to as GAL3ST2, is different from the GAL3ST2 gene located on chromosome 2 that encodes a related enzyme with distinct tissue distribution and substrate specificities, compared to galactose-3-O-sulfotransferase 3.
