= GAL3ST2 =

Protein-coding gene in humans

Identifiers
- Aliases: GAL3ST2, GAL3ST-2, GP3ST, galactose-3-O-sulfotransferase 2
- External IDs: OMIM: 608237; MGI: 2685834; GeneCards: GAL3ST2

Gene location (Human)
Chr.	Chromosome 2 (human)
Band	2q37.3	Start	241,776,822 bp
Band	2q37.3	End	241,804,287 bp

Gene location (Mouse)
Chr.	Chromosome 1 (mouse)
Band	1|1 D	Start	93,789,028 bp
Band	1|1 D	End	93,804,216 bp
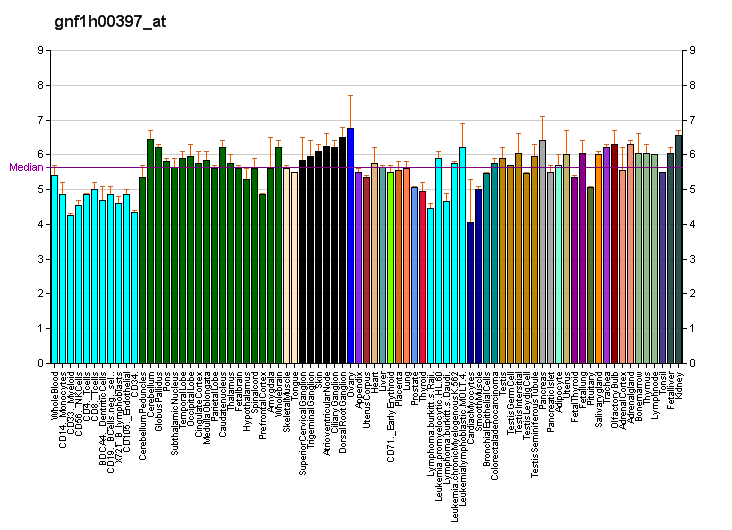
RNA expression pattern
Bgee	Human / Mouse (ortholog); Top expressed in: olfactory zone of nasal mucosa; mucosa of transverse colon; rectum; epithelium of colon; stromal cell of endometrium; right uterine tube; superior frontal gyrus; right lobe of liver; appendix; gallbladder / Top expressed in: jejunum; ileum; colon; duodenum; morula; embryo; blastocyst; zygote; spleen; thymus; More reference expression data
BioGPS	More reference expression data
Gene ontology
Molecular function	transferase activity; sulfotransferase activity; galactosylceramide sulfotransferase activity; protein binding
Cellular component	integral component of membrane; Golgi cisterna membrane; Golgi apparatus; membrane
Biological process	glycolipid biosynthetic process; biological process
Sources:Amigo / QuickGO
Orthologs
Databases	NCBI: entry; OMA: entry
Species	Human	Mouse
Entrez	64090	381334
Ensembl	ENSG00000154252; ENSG00000276126	ENSMUSG00000094651
UniProt	Q9H3Q3	Q6XQH0
RefSeq (mRNA)	NM_022134	NM_199366
RefSeq (protein)	NP_071417	NP_001192178
Location (UCSC)	Chr 2: 241.78 – 241.8 Mb	Chr 1: 93.79 – 93.8 Mb
PubMed search
- Wikidata
View/Edit Human	View/Edit Mouse

Galactose-3-O-sulfotransferase 2 is an enzyme that in humans is encoded by the GAL3ST2 gene.

This gene encodes a member of the galactose-3-O-sulfotransferase protein family. The product of this gene catalyzes sulfonation by transferring a sulfate group to the hydroxyl at C-3 of nonreducing beta-galactosyl residues, and it can act on both type 1 and type 2 (Galbeta 1-3/1-4GlcNAc-R) oligosaccharides with similar efficiencies, and on core 1 glycans. This enzyme has been implicated in tumor metastasis processes. This gene is different from the GAL3ST3 gene located on chromosome 11, which has also been referred to as GAL3ST2 and encodes a related enzyme with distinct tissue distribution and substrate specificities, compared to galactose-3-O-sulfotransferase 2.
