= Sulfation =

Addition of a sulfate group to a compound

Sulfation (sometimes spelled sulphation in British English) is the chemical reaction that entails the addition of SO_{3} group. In principle, many sulfations would involve reactions of sulfur trioxide (SO_{3}). In practice, most sulfations are effected less directly. Regardless of the mechanism, the installation of a sulfate-like group on a substrate leads to substantial changes.

== Sulfation in industry ==
=== Sulfation of calcium oxides ===
Sulfation is a process used to remove "sulfur" from the combustion of fossil fuels. The goal is to minimize the pollution by the combusted gases. Combustion of sulfur-containing fuels releases sulfur dioxide, which, in the atmosphere, oxidizes to the equivalent of sulfuric acid, which is corrosive. To minimize the problem, the combustion is often conducted in the presence of calcium oxide or calcium carbonate, which, directly or indirectly, bind sulfur dioxide and some oxygen to give calcium sulfite. The net reaction is:

CaO + SO_{2} → CaSO_{3}
2 CaSO_{3} + O_{2} → 2 CaSO_{4}

or the net reaction is sulfation, the addition of SO_{3}:

CaO + SO_{3} → CaSO_{4}

In the idealized scenario, the calcium sulfate (gypsum) is used as a construction material or, less desirably, deposited in a landfill.

=== Detergents, cosmetics, etc. ===
Sulfation is widely used in the production of consumer products such as detergents, shampoos, and cosmetics. Since the sulfate group is highly polar, its conjugation to a lipophilic "tail" gives surfacant-like properties. Well known sulfates are sodium lauryl sulfate and sodium laureth sulfate.

Alkylsulfate are produced from alcohols by reaction with chlorosulfuric acid:

ClSO_{3}H + ROH → ROSO_{3}H + HCl

Alternatively, alcohols can be sulfated to the half sulfate esters using sulfur trioxide. The reaction proceeds by initial formation of the pyrosulfate:

2 SO_{3} + RCH_{2}OH → RCH_{2}OSO_{2}−O−SO_{3}H
RCH_{2}OSO_{2}−O−SO_{3}H → RCH_{2}OSO_{3}H + SO_{3}

Several million tons of fatty acid sulfates are produced in this way annually. The most common example is sodium dodecylsulfate (SDS) derived from lauryl alcohol.

== Sulfation in biology ==
Heparin, a naturally occurring sulfated sugar is used in the treatment of deep vein thrombosis.

In biology, sulfation is typically effected by sulfotransferases, which catalyze the transfer of the equivalent of sulfur trioxide to substrate alcohols and phenols, converting the latter to sulfate esters. The source of the SO_{3} group is usually 3'-phosphoadenosine-5'-phosphosulfate (PAPS). When the substrate is an amine, the result is a sulfamate. Sulfation is one of the principal routes for post-translational modification of proteins.

Sulfation is involved in a variety of biological processes, including detoxification, hormone regulation, molecular recognition, cell signaling, and viral entry into cells. It is among the reactions in phase II drug metabolism, frequently effective in rendering a xenobiotic less active from a pharmacological and toxicological standpoint, but sometimes playing a role in the activation of xenobiotics (e.g. aromatic amines, methyl-substituted polycyclic aromatic hydrocarbons). Sulfate is part of sulfolipids, such as sulfatides, which constitute 20% of the galactolipids in myelin. Another example of biological sulfation is in the synthesis of sulfonated glycosaminoglycans, such as heparin, heparan sulfate, chondroitin sulfate, and dermatan sulfate. Sulfation is also a possible posttranslational modification of proteins.

=== Tyrosine sulfation ===
Tyrosine sulfation is a posttranslational modification in which a tyrosine residue of a protein is sulfated by a tyrosylprotein sulfotransferase (TPST) typically in the Golgi apparatus. Secreted proteins and extracellular parts of membrane proteins that pass through the Golgi apparatus may be sulfated. Sulfation occurs in animals and plants but not in prokaryotes or in yeasts. Sulfation sites are tyrosine residues exposed on the surface of the protein typically surrounded by acidic residues. The function of sulfation remains uncertain.

==== Regulation of tyrosine sulfation ====
Very limited evidence suggests that the TPST genes are subject to transcriptional regulation and tyrosine O-sulfate is very stable and cannot be easily degraded by mammalian sulfatases. Tyrosine O-sulfation is an irreversible process in vivo. An antibody called PSG2 shows high sensitivity and specificity for epitopes containing sulfotyrosine independent of the sequence context. New tools are being developed to study TPST's, using synthetic peptides and small molecule screens.

=== Seagrasses and seaweeds ===
Many edible seaweeds are composed on highly sulfated polysaccharides. The evolution of several sulfotransferases appears to have facilitated the adaptation of the terrestrial ancestors of seagrasses to a new marine habitat.

== See also ==
- Glucuronidation
- Methylation
- Hydrogenation
- Rosemary Waring
- Acetylation
