= C4b-binding protein =

Protein complex involved in the complement system

complement component 4 binding protein, alpha
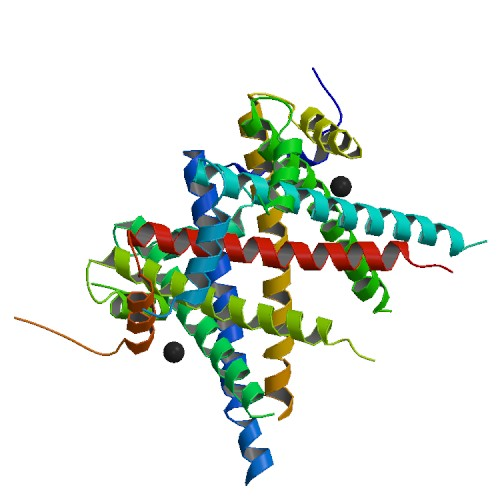

Identifiers
- Symbol: C4BPA
- Alt. symbols: C4BP
- NCBI gene: 722
- HGNC: 1325
- OMIM: 120830
- PDB: 4B0F
- RefSeq: NM_000715
- UniProt: P04003

Other data
- Locus: Chr. 1 q32
Search for
- Structures: Swiss-model
- Domains: InterPro

complement component 4 binding protein, beta

Identifiers
- Symbol: C4BPB
- Alt. symbols: C4BP
- NCBI gene: 725
- HGNC: 1328
- OMIM: 120831
- RefSeq: NM_000716
- UniProt: P20851

Other data
- Locus: Chr. 1 q32
Search for
- Structures: Swiss-model
- Domains: InterPro

C4b-binding protein (C4BP) is a protein complex involved in the complement system where it acts as inhibitor. C4BP has an octopus-like structure with a central stalk and seven branching alpha-chains. The main form of C4BP in human blood is composed of 7 identical alpha-chains and one unique beta-chain, which in turn binds anticoagulant, vitamin K-dependent protein S.

C4BP is a large glycoprotein (500 kDa) with an estimated plasma concentration of 200 micrograms/mL synthesized mainly in the liver.

The genes coding for C4BP α-chain (C4BPA) and β-chain (C4BPB) are located in the regulators of complement activation (RCA) gene cluster on the long arm of chromosome 1 in the vicinity of other complement inhibitors.

== Functions ==
It inhibits the action the classical and the lectin pathways, more specifically C4. It also has ability to bind C3b. C4BP accelerates decay of C3-convertase and is a cofactor for serine protease factor I which cleaves C4b and C3b.

C4BP binds apoptotic and necrotic cells as well as DNA, to clean up after injury. The interaction with apoptotic and necrotic cells is mediated by the Gla domain of protein S and does not affect the ability of C4BP to inhibit complement.

A number of bacterial and fungal pathogens capture human C4BP and use it to prevent binding of C4b, which allows them to establish infection.

No full deficiency of C4BP has been found yet.

C4BP interacts also with heparin, C-reactive protein (CRP), serum amyloid P component (SAP), fibromodulin, osteoadherin, chondroadherin, proline arginine-rich end leucine-rich repeat protein (PRELP), streptococcal M-proteins, gonococcal porins, Outer membrane protein A from E. coli, Ubiquitous surface protein 1 and 2 from Moraxella.
