= Endo-beta-galactosidase =

Endo-beta-galactosidase may refer to the following enzymes:

- Blood-group-substance endo-1,4-beta-galactosidase
- Keratan-sulfate endo-1,4-beta-galactosidase
