= Beta-galactoside alpha-2,3-sialyltransferase =

Enzyme

beta-galactoside alpha-2,3-sialyltransferase

Identifiers
- EC no.: 2.4.99.4
- CAS no.: 71124-51-1

Databases
- IntEnz: IntEnz view
- BRENDA: BRENDA entry
- ExPASy: NiceZyme view
- KEGG: KEGG entry
- MetaCyc: metabolic pathway
- PRIAM: profile
- PDB structures: RCSB PDB PDBe PDBsum
- Gene Ontology: AmiGO / QuickGO
Search
- PMC: articles
- PubMed: articles
- NCBI: proteins

In enzymology, a beta-galactoside alpha-2,3-sialyltransferase (EC 2.4.99.4) is an enzyme that catalyzes the chemical reaction

CMP-N-acetylneuraminate + beta-D-galactosyl-1,3-N-acetyl-alpha-D-galactosaminyl-R $\rightleftharpoons$ CMP + alpha-N-acetylneuraminyl-2,3-beta-D-galactosyl-1,3-N-acetyl-alpha-D- galactosaminyl-R

Thus, the two substrates of this enzyme are CMP-N-acetylneuraminate and beta-D-galactosyl-1,3-N-acetyl-alpha-D-galactosaminyl-R, whereas its 3 products are CMP, alpha-N-acetylneuraminyl-2,3-beta-D-galactosyl-1,3-N-acetyl-alpha-D-, and galactosaminyl-R.

This enzyme belongs to the family of transferases, specifically those glycosyltransferases that do not transfer hexosyl or pentosyl groups. The systematic name of this enzyme class is CMP-N-acetylneuraminate:beta-D-galactoside alpha-2,3-N-acetylneuraminyl-transferase. This enzyme participates in 7 metabolic pathways: O-glycan biosynthesis, keratan sulfate biosynthesis, glycosphingolipid biosynthesis - lactoseries, glycosphingolipid biosynthesis - globoseries, glycosphingolipid biosynthesis - ganglioseries, glycan structures - biosynthesis 1, and glycan structures - biosynthesis 2.

== Structural studies ==
As of late 2007, 9 structures have been solved for this class of enzymes, with PDB accession codes 2EX0, 2EX1, 2IHJ, 2IHK, 2IHZ, 2II6, 2IIB, 2IIQ, and 2ILV.
