= Keratocan =

KERA

Identifiers
- Aliases: KERA, CNA2, KTN, SLRR2B, keratocan
- External IDs: OMIM: 603288; MGI: 1202398; GeneCards: KERA

Gene location (Human)
Chr.	Chromosome 12 (human)
Band	12q21.33	Start	91,050,491 bp
Band	12q21.33	End	91,058,024 bp

Gene location (Mouse)
Chr.	Chromosome 10 (mouse)
Band	10 C3|10 50.34 cM	Start	97,442,741 bp
Band	10 C3|10 50.34 cM	End	97,449,554 bp
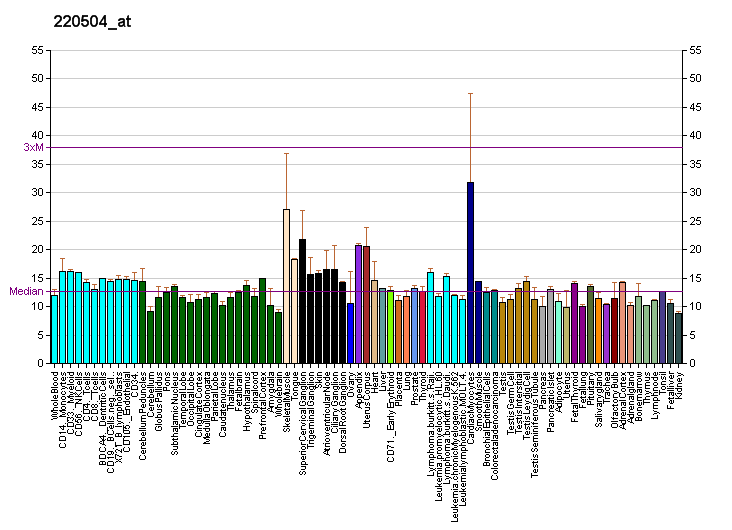
RNA expression pattern
Bgee	Human / Mouse (ortholog); Top expressed in: Achilles tendon; testicle; cartilage tissue; synovial joint; tendon of biceps brachii; synovial membrane; gallbladder; lower lobe of lung; tibialis anterior muscle; trachea / Top expressed in: cornea; corneal stroma; conjunctival fornix; ankle; body of femur; digastric muscle; temporal muscle; intercostal muscle; triceps brachii muscle; soleus muscle; More reference expression data
BioGPS	More reference expression data
Gene ontology
Molecular function	molecular function
Cellular component	Golgi lumen; extracellular region; lysosomal lumen; extracellular space; extracellular matrix
Biological process	cornea development in camera-type eye; keratan sulfate biosynthetic process; keratan sulfate catabolic process; axonogenesis; response to stimulus; visual perception
Sources:Amigo / QuickGO
Orthologs
Databases	NCBI: entry; OMA: entry
Species	Human	Mouse
Entrez	11081	16545
Ensembl	ENSG00000139330	ENSMUSG00000019932
UniProt	O60938	O35367
RefSeq (mRNA)	NM_007035	NM_008438
RefSeq (protein)	NP_008966	NP_032464
Location (UCSC)	Chr 12: 91.05 – 91.06 Mb	Chr 10: 97.44 – 97.45 Mb
PubMed search
- Wikidata
View/Edit Human	View/Edit Mouse

Keratocan (KTN) also known as keratan sulfate proteoglycan keratocan, is a protein that in humans is encoded by the KERA gene.

Keratan sulfate proteoglycans (KSPGs) are members of the small leucine-rich proteoglycan (SLRP) family. KSPGs, particularly keratocan, lumican and mimecan, are important to the transparency of the cornea.

Mutations of the gene cause cornea plana 2.
