= CNA2 =

CNA2 may refer to:

- Cornea plana 2
- Highgate Airport
