= Lumican =

LUM

Identifiers
- Aliases: LUM, LDC, SLRR2D, lumican
- External IDs: OMIM: 600616; MGI: 109347; GeneCards: LUM

Gene location (Human)
Chr.	Chromosome 12 (human)
Band	12q21.33	Start	91,102,629 bp
Band	12q21.33	End	91,111,494 bp

Gene location (Mouse)
Chr.	Chromosome 10 (mouse)
Band	10 C3|10 50.32 cM	Start	97,400,990 bp
Band	10 C3|10 50.32 cM	End	97,408,565 bp
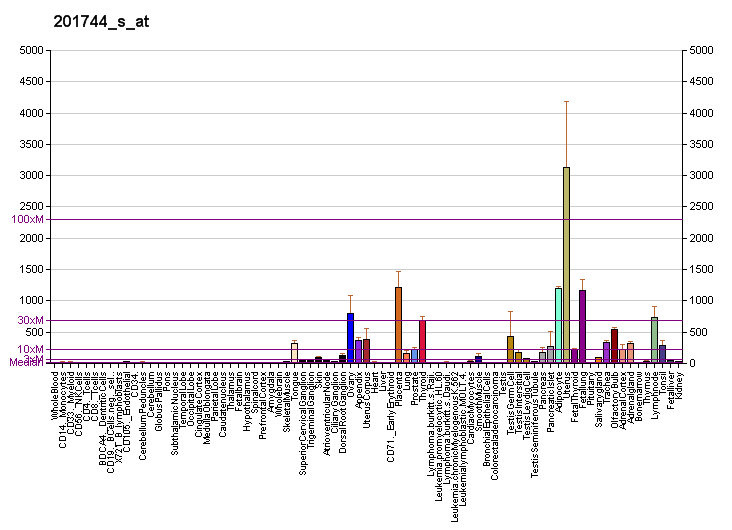
RNA expression pattern
Bgee	Human / Mouse (ortholog); Top expressed in: gallbladder; mucosa of paranasal sinus; Achilles tendon; synovial joint; tibia; visceral pleura; superficial temporal artery; lactiferous duct; tendon of biceps brachii; vena cava / Top expressed in: calvaria; molar; body of femur; dermis; umbilical cord; efferent ductule; vas deferens; semi-lunar valve; ankle; sciatic nerve; More reference expression data
BioGPS	More reference expression data
Gene ontology
Molecular function	collagen binding; extracellular matrix structural constituent; protein binding; extracellular matrix structural constituent conferring compression resistance
Cellular component	extracellular matrix; fibrillar collagen trimer; lysosomal lumen; Golgi lumen; extracellular exosome; extracellular space; extracellular region; collagen-containing extracellular matrix
Biological process	response to organic cyclic compound; axonogenesis; collagen fibril organization; extracellular matrix organization; positive regulation of transforming growth factor beta1 production; cartilage development; keratan sulfate catabolic process; response to growth factor; keratan sulfate biosynthetic process; positive regulation of transcription by RNA polymerase II; visual perception
Sources:Amigo / QuickGO
Orthologs
Databases	NCBI: entry; OMA: entry
Species	Human	Mouse
Entrez	4060	17022
Ensembl	ENSG00000139329	ENSMUSG00000036446
UniProt	P51884	P51885
RefSeq (mRNA)	NM_002345	NM_008524
RefSeq (protein)	NP_002336	NP_032550
Location (UCSC)	Chr 12: 91.1 – 91.11 Mb	Chr 10: 97.4 – 97.41 Mb
PubMed search
- Wikidata
View/Edit Human	View/Edit Mouse

Lumican, also known as LUM, is an extracellular matrix protein that, in humans, is encoded by the LUM gene on chromosome 12.

== Structure ==
Lumican is a proteoglycan Class II member of the small leucine-rich proteoglycan (SLRP) family that includes decorin, biglycan, fibromodulin, keratocan, epiphycan, and osteoglycin.

Like the other SLRPs, lumican has a molecular weight of about 40 kilodaltons and has four major intramolecular domains:

1. a signal peptide of 16 amino acid residues;
2. a negatively-charged N-terminal domain containing sulfated tyrosine and disulfide bond(s);
3. ten tandem leucine-rich repeats allowing lumican to bind to other extracellular components such as collagen;
4. a carboxyl terminal domain of 50 amino acid residues containing two conserved cysteines 32 residues apart.

There are four N-linked sites within the leucine-rich repeat domain of the protein core that can be substituted with keratan sulfate. The core protein of lumican (like decorin and fibromodulin) is horseshoe shaped. This enables it bind to collagen molecules within a collagen fibril, thus helping keep adjacent fibrils apart.

== Function ==
Lumican is a major keratan sulfate proteoglycan of the cornea but is ubiquitously distributed in most mesenchymal tissues throughout the body. Lumican is involved in collagen fibril organization and circumferential growth, corneal transparency, and epithelial cell migration and tissue repair. Corneal transparency is possible due to the exact alignment of collagen fibers by lumican (and keratocan) in the intrafibrillar space.

== Clinical significance ==
Mice that have the lumican gene knocked out (Lum-/-) develop opacities of the cornea in both eyes and fragile skin. The lumican (LUM) gene was thought to be a candidate susceptibility gene for high myopia; however, a meta-analysis showed no association between LUM polymorphism and high myopia susceptibility in all genetic models studied.

Lum knockout mice also have abnormal collagen in their heart tissue, with fewer and thicker fibrils. Mice deficient in both lumican and fibromodulin develop severe tendinopathy (tendon pathology), revealing the importance of these SLRPs in the development of correctly sized and aligned collagen fibers in tendon. Along with other extracellular matrix components, lumican expression was increased in equine flexor tendons six weeks after an injury.

Lumican is present in the extracellular matrix of uteral tissues in fertile women. There is an increase of lumican during the proliferative to secretory phase of the endometrium. In menopausal endometrial tissue, the level of lumican expression decreases and is also low in pathological compared to normal endometrium.

Lumican is highly expressed in pleural effusions (lung fluid) of patients with adenocarcinoma. Its expression was low in cancer cells but high in the extracellular matrix surrounding the tumor. Lumican expression was not associated with tumor grade or stage. In about half the patients with pancreatic ductal adenocarcinoma tested, lumican in the extracellular matrix around the tumor was associated with a reduction in metastatic recurrence after surgery and with a three-fold longer survival than patients without stromal lumican. As lumican can directly bind to and inhibit matrix metalloproteinase-14 (MMP14), lumican may limit tumor progression by preventing extracellular matrix collagen proteolysis by this enzyme.
