= Cornea plana =

Cornea plana may refer to:

- Cornea plana 1, an eye condition
- Cornea plana 2, an eye condition
