= N-acetyllactosaminide beta-1,3-N-acetylglucosaminyltransferase =

Class of enzymes

Identifiers
- EC no.: 2.4.1.149
- CAS no.: 85638-39-7

Databases
- IntEnz: IntEnz view
- BRENDA: BRENDA entry
- ExPASy: NiceZyme view
- KEGG: KEGG entry
- MetaCyc: metabolic pathway
- PRIAM: profile
- PDB structures: RCSB PDB PDBe PDBsum
- Gene Ontology: AmiGO / QuickGO
Search
- PMC: articles
- PubMed: articles
- NCBI: proteins

In enzymology, a N-acetyllactosaminide beta-1,3-N-acetylglucosaminyltransferase (EC 2.4.1.149) is an enzyme that catalyzes the chemical reaction

UDP-N-acetyl-D-glucosamine + beta-D-galactosyl-1,4-N-acetyl-D-glucosaminyl-R $\rightleftharpoons$ UDP + N-acetyl-beta-D-glucosaminyl-1,3-beta-D-galactosyl-1,4-N-acetyl-D- glucosaminyl-R

Thus, the two substrates of this enzyme are UDP-N-acetyl-D-glucosamine and beta-D-galactosyl-1,4-N-acetyl-D-glucosaminyl-R, whereas its 3 products are UDP, N-acetyl-beta-D-glucosaminyl-1,3-beta-D-galactosyl-1,4-N-acetyl-D-, and glucosaminyl-R.

This enzyme belongs to the family of glycosyltransferases, specifically the hexosyltransferases. The systematic name of this enzyme class is UDP-N-acetyl-D-glucosamine:beta-D-galactosyl-1,4-N-acetyl-D-glucosam ine beta-1,3-acetyl-D-glucosaminyltransferase. Other names in common use include uridine diphosphoacetylglucosamine-acetyllactosaminide, beta1->3-acetylglucosaminyltransferase, poly-N-acetyllactosamine extension enzyme, Galbeta1->4GlcNAc-R beta1->3 N-acetylglucosaminyltransferase, UDP-GlcNAc:GalR, beta-D-3-N-acetylglucosaminyltransferase, N-acetyllactosamine beta(1–3)N-acetylglucosaminyltransferase, UDP-GlcNAc:Galbeta1->4GlcNAcbeta-Rbeta1->3-N-, acetylglucosaminyltransferase, and GnTE. This enzyme participates in 4 metabolic pathways: keratan sulfate biosynthesis, glycosphingolipid biosynthesis - neo-lactoseries, glycan structures - biosynthesis 1, and glycan structures - biosynthesis 2.
