= Cornea plana 2 =

- Other names: Autosomal recessive Cornea plana, CNA2.
- Cornea plana 2 is inherited in an autosomal recessive manner.
- Specialty: Medical genetics

Cornea plana 2 (CNA2) is a congenital disorder that causes the cornea to flatten and the angle between the sclera and cornea to shrink. This could result in the early development of arcus lipoides, hazy corneal limbus, and hyperopia. There is evidence that cornea plana 2 is caused by mutations in KERA gene encoding keratocan. Cornea plana 2 is an autosomal recessive disorder.

== Signs and symptoms ==
Cornea plana commonly presents as a flat cornea, early-onset arcus lipoides, low anterior chamber depth, and an indistinct border between the sclera and cornea due to a decreased angle between the two. Although a small corneal diameter is anticipated, measuring it can be challenging because the scleral tissue overlaps the cornea by a few millimeters. In the patients who have cornea plana, the anterior chamber depth has been found to vary from 0.8 to 2.1 mm.

Moreover, high hyperopia, strabismus, microcornea, posterior embryotoxon, iridocorneal adhesions, iris lumps, iris wasting, and pupillary abnormalities can all be present. Instead of hyperopia, myopia has been identified in a few cases. As many as 90 percent of cases have a bilateral presentation, which is linked to sclerocornea. Finally, congenital ptosis has also been reported, and the absence of corneal protrusion is most likely the cause.

== Diagnosis ==
Clinical presentation, keratometry, pachymetry, and endothelial imaging are used to make the diagnosis.Since the decreased refraction in the autosomal recessive form is more severe than in the autosomal dominant form, corneal refraction measurements can be used to differentiate between CNA1 and CNA2.Histology is distinguished by acanthosis, keratinization of the corneal epithelium, Bowman's membrane defects, and stromal vascularization and scar formation.

== See also ==
- Cornea plana 1
- Keratoglobus
