= Keratan-sulfate endo-1,4-beta-galactosidase =

Keratan-sulfate endo-1,4-β-galactosidase

Identifiers
- EC no.: 3.2.1.103
- CAS no.: 55072-01-0

Databases
- IntEnz: IntEnz view
- BRENDA: BRENDA entry
- ExPASy: NiceZyme view
- KEGG: KEGG entry
- MetaCyc: metabolic pathway
- PRIAM: profile
- PDB structures: RCSB PDB PDBe PDBsum
Search
- PMC: articles
- PubMed: articles
- NCBI: proteins

Keratan-sulfate endo-1,4-β-galactosidase (EC 3.2.1.103, endo-β-galactosidase, keratan sulfate endogalactosidase, keratanase, keratan-sulfate 1,4-β-D-galactanohydrolase) is an enzyme with systematic name keratan-sulfate 4-β-D-galactanohydrolase. It catalyses endohydrolysis of (1→4)-β-D-galactosidic linkages in keratan sulfate.

It hydrolyses the 1,4-β-D-galactosyl linkages adjacent to 1,3-N-acetyl-α-D-glucosaminyl residues.
