= Sclerocornea =

- This condition can be inherited in an autosomal dominant manner
- Specialty: Ophthalmology

Sclerocornea is an extremely rare congenital anomaly of the eye, it is considered a form of congenital corneal opacity (CCO) with no clear gender bias, in which the cornea blends with sclera, having no clear-cut boundary. The extent of the resulting opacity varies from peripheral to total (sclerocornea totalis). While the exact historical origins of its documentation are unclear, studies on sclerocornea has long been recognized in ophthalmology as a rare but significant anomaly going as far back as the 1960's. The severe form is thought to be inherited in an autosomal recessive manner, but there may be another, milder form that is expressed in a dominant fashion. In some cases the patients also have abnormalities beyond the eye (systemic), such as limb deformities and craniofacial and genitourinary defects.

According to one tissue analysis performed after corneal transplantation, the sulfation pattern of keratan sulfate proteoglycans in the affected area is typical for corneal rather than scleral tissue.

Sclerocornea may be concurrent with cornea plana.

== Signs and symptoms ==
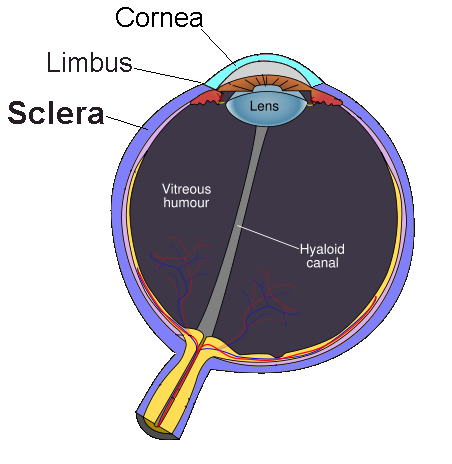
Anatomy of the human eye

Sclerocornea causes parts or all of the cornea to become cloudy. This cloudiness can be partial or complete. The more of the cornea that is affected, the worse a persons vision will be. The main area affected is the cornea, but the issue can also spread to nearby parts of the eye, like the limbus and front eye structure, such as the iris. Since Sclerocornea is present from birth and does not develop later in life there are no short-term symptoms or signs. The condition usually affects both eyes and it does not worsen over time, the symptoms and severity are present from birth and generally remain stable.

As a result and depending on the variety, the patient may have poor vision from birth and in some cases problems with eye movement, such as nystagmus or strabismus. Over time, people may develop severe farsightedness, glaucoma, and other eye issues.

== Cause ==
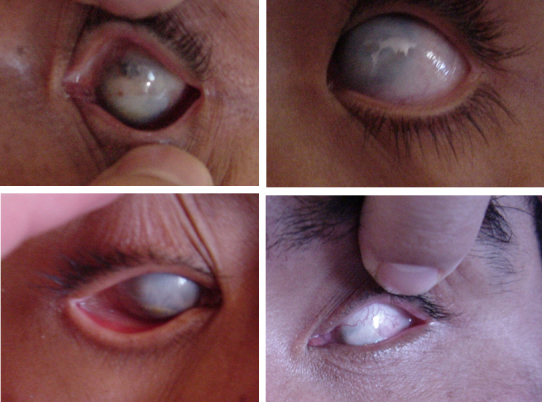
Phenotypic appearance in patients with sclerocornea, aphakia, and microphthalmia.

The exact cause of Sclerocornea is not fully understood, but it is believed to involve genetics and developmental factors during fetus development. Sclerocornea can be inherited genetically, as autosomal dominant or recessive trait, with the latter form often being more severe. There are findings suggesting that a genetic locus at chromosome 22q11.2 plays a crucial role in the formation and development of the eye during the early stages of embryonic growth. This gene in some cases are associated with the genetic disorders like Digeorge syndrome, PHACES syndrome, Dandy-walker malformation, and Hurler syndrome making genetic counseling important.

The condition is thought to occur because the neural crest cells don't move or develop correctly between the 7th and 10th week of pregnancy. These cells are important for forming many parts of the eye structures, and abnormalities in their formation can lead to issues.

Recent research has highlighted the role of mutation/deletion in the RAD21 gene. A 2019 study suggest that beyond its known role in cell division and chromosome organization, RAD21 may also contribute to the development of peripheral sclerocornea.

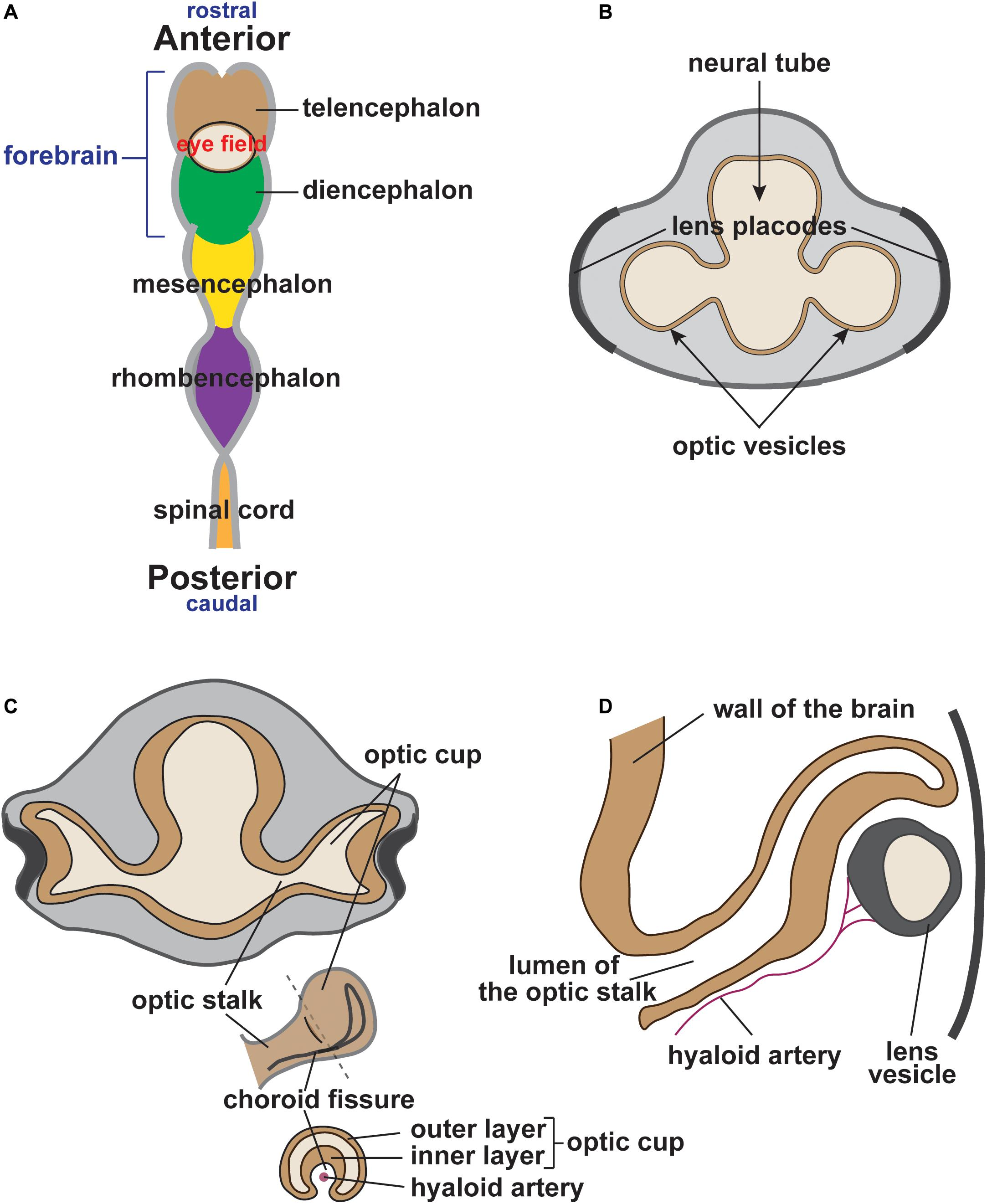
Vertebrate eye development (human eye). (A) During early vertebrate development, the eye field is established at the boundary between the telencephalon (brown) and the diencephalon (green). (B) Optic vesicles bilaterally protrude from either side of the forebrain approaching the thickened surface ectoderm (lens placodes). (C) The interaction between the optic vesicle and the lens placode of the surface ectoderm results in optic vesicle invagination, optic cup formation and lens placode evagination (lens pit). Simultaneously, the optic fissure is formed along the inferonasal aspect of the optic cup, which surrounds the hyaloid artery. (D) Continued evagination of surface ectoderm leads to the formation of an independent lens vesicle.

== Pathophysiology ==
The main problem affected in sclerocornea occurs in the cornea, which doesn't develop correctly and starts to look more like the white part of the eye (the sclera). The condition is thought to occur because certain cells, called neural crest cells, don't move or develop as they should during the 7th and 10th weeks of gestation. When these cells do not migrate correctly, the cornea does not develop into a clear structure. Instead, it becomes opaque and the boundary of the cornea is found to be poorly defined.

Under a microscope, the cornea's layers, known as stromal lamellae, are disorganized, have extra blood vessels, and the cornea's structure is different from the usual structure of cornea's. Even though the cornea becomes more like the sclera, it still has some unique markers that show it retains some of its original characteristics.

Scientists don't fully understand how all the changes happen, but they think it could be due to problems with certain genes such as 22q11.2. There are also studies coming out stating that a mutation or deletions in the gene RAD21 might be causing the bad development of neural crest cells.

== Diagnosis ==
Diagnosis typically involves a pediatric ophthalmologist after a basic outpatient examination and might require a geneticist for counseling if an inherited form is suspected. A slit-lamp examination is used to evaluate the cornea. Imaging techniques, such as anterior segment optical coherence tomography (ASOCT), can help assess the depth of the opacity and the structure of the anterior segment of the eye. Other evaluations include under anesthesia to get measurement of corneal thickness with ultrasound pachymetry.

Misdiagnosis can happen due to overlapping features with other congenital corneal opacities. Diagnostic delays may happen if systemic associations are not immediately recognized.

== Treatment ==
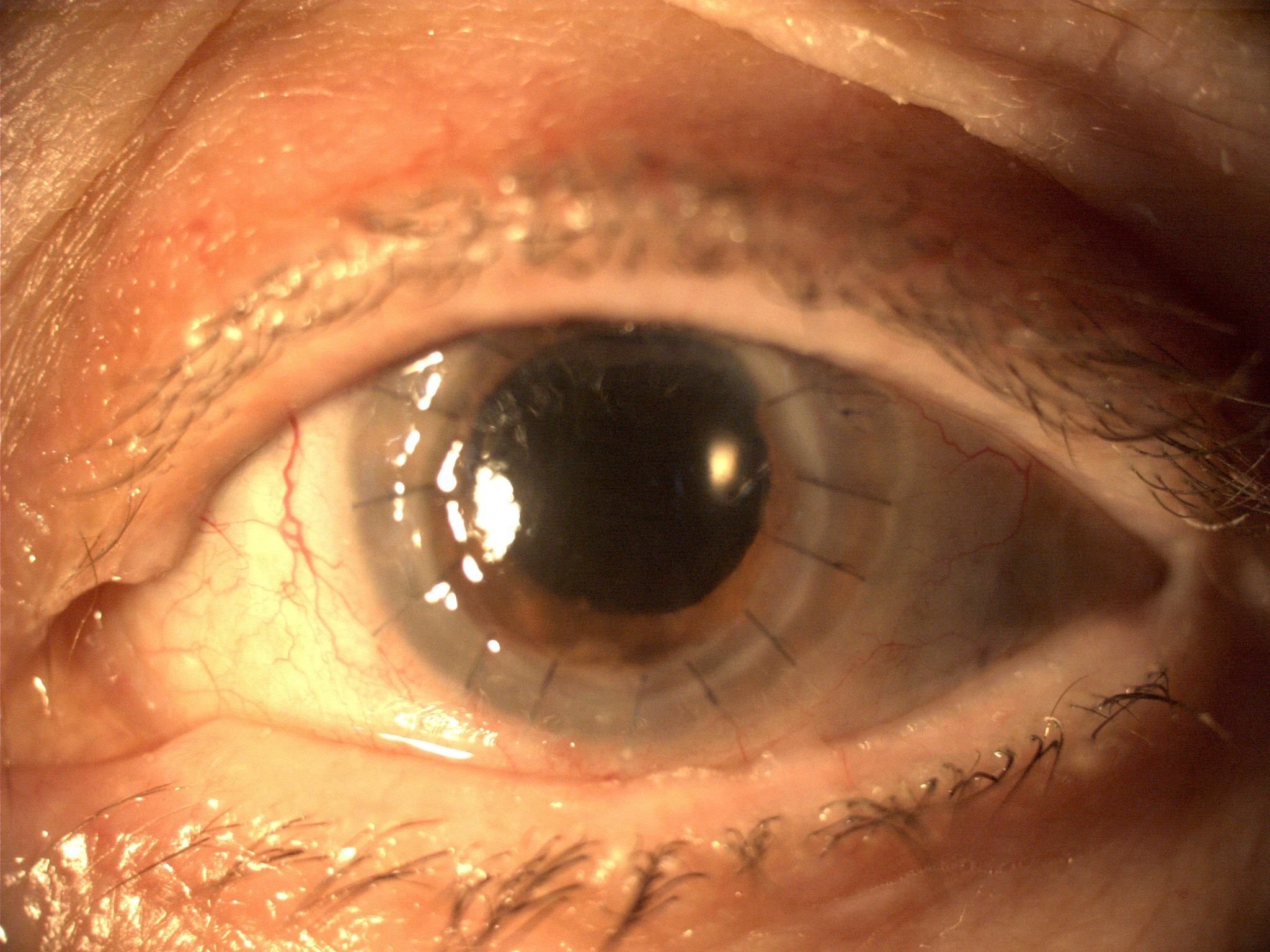
Penetrating keratoplasty. The goal is improve the vision or if not, restore the integrity of the ocular globe

Primary treatment for Sclerocornea is Penetrating keratoplasty (PK), it is only considered for severe cases although success rates are variable due to risks like graft rejection and glaucoma. In a study, of eight patients with Peters anomaly and 10 with sclerocornea, underwent penetrating keratoplasty when they were 5 years or younger. The graft survival was poor in patients with sclerocornea compared to those with peters anomaly. Another study showed failure in 75% of the cases of PK (penetrating keratoplasty) in patients with sclerocornea. It is said that the presence of opacity or vascularization in the limbus and in the peripheral cornea and the diameter of the patients cornea were correlated with graft failure.

Non surgical options include refractive correction, such as glasses or contacts if possible or optical iridotomy, this can be considered for milder cases.

== Prognosis ==
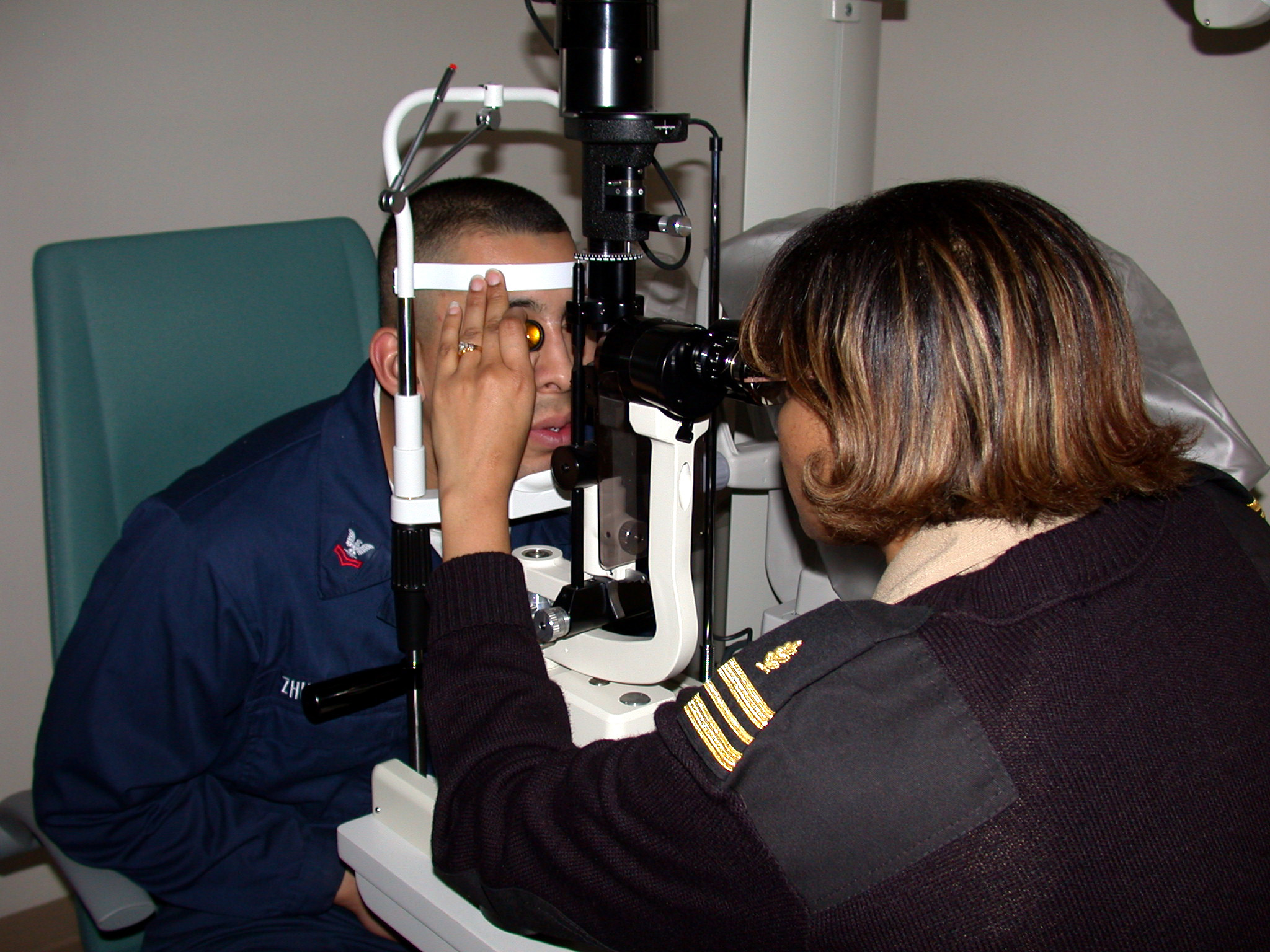
Slit lamp exam

The prognosis depends on the extent of the condition. Visual outcomes depend on the timing and extend of intervention. Treatment of sclerocornea has a high rate of failing however those that succeed with treatment are likely to have favorable outcomes. The poor prognosis of corneal transplantation in sclerocornea is related to corneal vascularization, related to changes in the eye mostly glaucoma, and the need for related surgeries such as lensectomy, a surgical procedure that removes the eye's natural lens and replaces it with an implant and vitrectomy, among others. In patients with partial sclerocornea, optical correction, with glasses, should be performed early in order to avoid amblyopia due to high hyperopia.

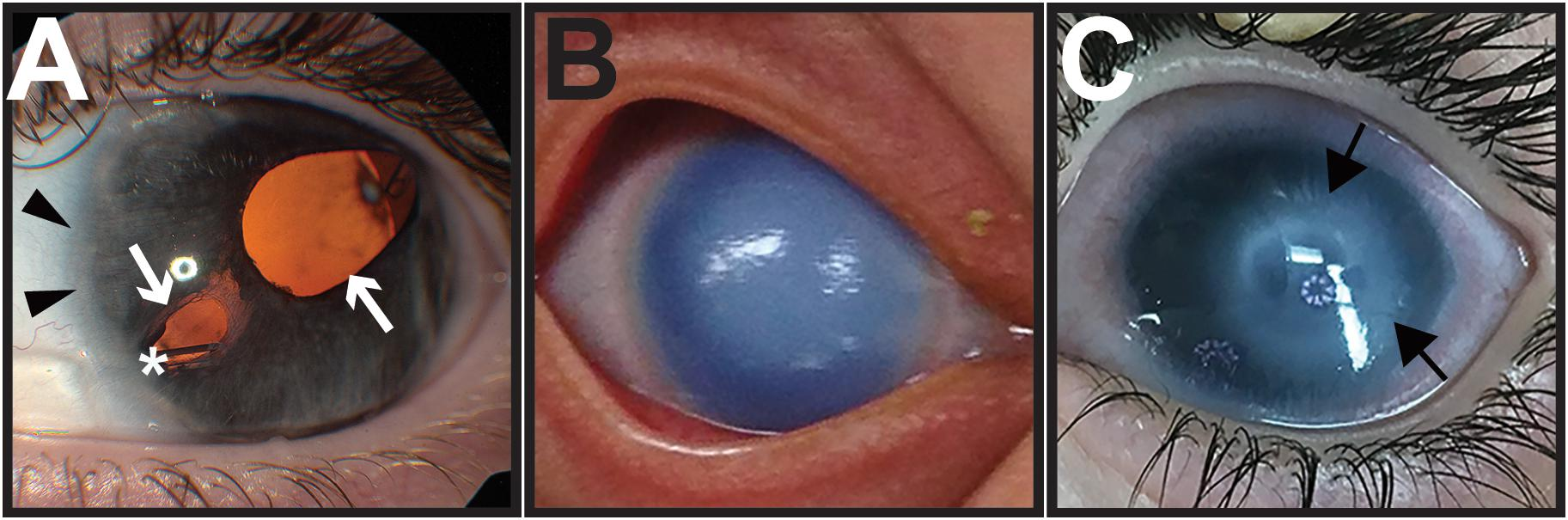
(C) Peters anomaly shows central corneal opacification (black arrows) reflecting the abnormal separation of the lens vesicle from the surface ectoderm looking similar to scleracornea

== Epidemiology ==
Sclerocornea is a rare disorder, with no clear gender bias. In one study, 14 patients were diagnosed with a congenital corneal opacity over a 40-year study period, yielding a birth prevalence of 1 in 5188 live births. The mean age at diagnosis was 7.5 months (range 0–48 months) and 9 (64.3%) were males. Out of the 14 patients diagnosed only 2 of them had sclerocornea. This condition also often accompanies other congenital disorders such as peters anaomly, affecting its distribution and manifestation.

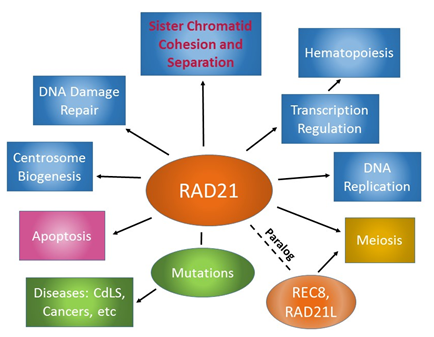
RAD21 has many roles including DNA damage repair, transcription regulation, DNA replication, and centrosome biogenesis, etc. Diseases rise when mutations in RAD21 disrupt its function (in green).

== Research directions ==
Recent research has focused on the genetic causes of sclerocornea and improving treatment options. Studies have identified that mutations in specific genes play a role in different forms of the condition.

GJA8 Mutations: Researchers found that mutations in the GJA8 gene can cause a severe form of sclerocornea, where the entire cornea is affected. This highlights the importance of testing for GJA8 mutations in patients with severe anterior segment abnormalities.

RAD21 Variant: Another study linked a RAD21 variant to peripheral sclerocornea, suggesting that this mutation alters chromosome structure and gene expression, contributing to the condition.

One of the main challenges in sclerocornea research is the rarity of the disease, which makes large-scale studies difficult. However, ongoing collaborative efforts and case reports are helping to expand understanding, particularly in developing new treatment strategies and documenting unique cases
