= TMEM98 =

Protein-coding gene in the species Homo sapiens

Identifiers
- Aliases: TMEM98, NNO4, TADA1, transmembrane protein 98
- External IDs: OMIM: 615949; MGI: 1923457; GeneCards: TMEM98

Gene location (Human)
Chr.	Chromosome 17 (human)
Band	17q11.2	Start	32,927,910 bp
Band	17q11.2	End	32,945,106 bp
RNA expression pattern
Bgee	Human / Mouse (ortholog); Top expressed in: mucosa of ileum; retinal pigment epithelium; stromal cell of endometrium; ventricular zone; left ovary; ganglionic eminence; corpus callosum; right ovary; gallbladder; rectum / n/a; More reference expression data
BioGPS	n/a
Orthologs
Databases	NCBI: entry; OMA: entry
Species	Human	Mouse
Entrez	26022	103743
Ensembl	ENSG00000006042	ENSMUSG00000035413
UniProt	Q9Y2Y6	Q91X86
RefSeq (mRNA)	NM_015544; NM_001033504; NM_001301746	NM_029537
RefSeq (protein)	NP_001028676; NP_001288675; NP_056359	NP_083813
Location (UCSC)	Chr 17: 32.93 – 32.95 Mb	n/a
PubMed search
- Wikidata
View/Edit Human	View/Edit Mouse

Transmembrane protein 98 is a single-pass membrane protein that in humans is encoded by the TMEM98 gene. The function of this protein is currently unknown. TMEM98 is also known as UNQ536/PRO1079.

== Gene ==
This gene is found on the plus strand of chromosome 17 at locus 17q11.2. It spans from base pairs 31,254,928 to 31,272,124.

=== Variants ===
There are two known transcript variants that encode for TMEM98. Variant one corresponds to the longer of the two, has 8 exons, and is 1808 bases in length. Variant two codes for the same protein, but is slightly shorter at exon 2 and is missing exon 3; it is 1732 bases long. This missing region corresponds to 85 base pairs near the end of the 5' UTR. Variant one is more abundant than Variant two with 17 times the amount mRNA extracted in various human tissue experiments.

== Evolution ==
=== Paralogs ===
There are no known paralogs for TMEM98. While not functional, there are two pseudogenes found on chromosome 6 and 14 in Homo sapiens.

=== Orthologs ===
Transmembrane protein 98 is highly conserved in fish, amphibians, reptiles, birds, and other non-human mammals. It is only slightly conserved and invertebrates and insects and is not found in bacteria, archaea, protists, plants, or fungi.

Genus and species	Common name	Class	Accession	Percent identity
Pan paniscus	Bonobo	Mammalia	XP_003818064.1	99%
Felis catus	Common House Cat	Mammalia	XP_003996602	99%
Mus musculus	Mouse	Mammalia	NP_083813.1	99%
Myotis davidii	Mouse-Eared Bat	Mammalia	ELK33053.1	95%
Heterocephalus glaber	Naked Mole Rat	Mammalia	EHB09150.1	94%
Anolis carolinensis	Arboreal Lizard	Reptilia	XP_003222593	85%
Taeniopygia guttata	Zebra Finch	Aves	XP_002193870.1	78%
Tetraodon nigrovirdis	Green Spotten Puffer Fish	Actinopterygii	CAG07250.1	78%
Bombus impatiens	Common Eastern Bubblebee	Insecta	XP_003489307.1	42%
Harpegnathos saltator	Jumping Ant	Insecta	EFN84682.1	40%
Trichinella spiralis	Nematode Parasite	Annelida	XP_003372303.1	37%

=== Phylogeny ===
The percent change over time graph was made using Time Tree.

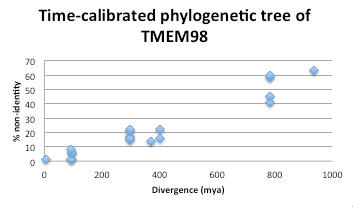
Percent Change Over Time

== Protein ==
Transcript Variant one and two code for the same protein of 226 amino acids. The protein is 24.6 kdal with an isoelectric point of 4.26.

=== Domains ===
There is no signal peptide in this protein. The transmembrane domain is 22 amino acids long and is located from amino acids 6-28. Amino acids on the N-terminus side are located outside of the cell, and amino acids on the C-terminius side are outside of the cell.

The paralogous domain Grap2 and cyclin-D-interacting (pfam13324) spans from 81-151 and is highly conserved in orthologs. This region is involved in the regulation of proliferation and cell differentiation using Grap2 and cyclin-d-mediated signaling pathways.

=== Secondary structure ===
TMEM98 is composed of 7 alpha helices as predicted by NCBI CBLAST with an e-value of 9 × 10^{−7}.

== Regulation ==
=== mRNA level ===
The promoter region is 901 base pairs in length. The most highly conserved predicted transcription factors are shown below.

Transcription factor	Start	End	Strand	Sequence
GC-box factors SP1/GC	58	74	+	gtagGGGGtgtgtgttt
C2H2 zinc finger transcription factor 5	102	116	+	tgtatgGGATggagt
C2H2 zinc finger transcription factor 2	48	70	-	acacaCCCCctaccctgccatcc
Motif composed of binding sites for pluripotency or stem cell factors	151	169	+	gggctctGCATttgtactc
Calcium-response element	352	362	+	agaccGAGGca
CP2-erythrocyte Factor released to drosophila Elf1 II B	386	404	-	cTCTGccactcactagcta
GC-box factors SP1/GC	500	516	+	gcccgGGGCggggcgca
Metal induced transcription factor	505	519	-	gcctGCGCcccgccc
KRAB domain zinc finger protein 57	543	555	+	gtcTGCCgcccgg
Pleomorphic adenoma gene	567	589	+	cgGGGGcgcgaggaaggggtgtt
CTCF and BORIS gene family, transcriptional regulators	615	641	+	tgccccggccgccgGGGGgcctggcgg
EGR/nerve growth factor induced protein C and release factor	695	713	+	gggcgcggGGGCgcgaggc
E2F-myc activator and cell cycle regulator	663	679	-	ggcccgcgcCAAAtccc
RNA polymerase II transcription factor	670	676	-	ccgCGCC
RNA polymerase II transcription factor	696	702	-	ccgCGCC
Nuclear respiratory factor 1	694	710	-	tcgcGCCCccgcgcccc
Selenocysteine tRNA activation factor	725	755	+	ggccgcggcgcttCCCGgcatgctccgctgc
Nuclear respiratory factor 1	758	774	+	gcccGCGCccgcgcccg
Histone nuclear factor P	771	783	+	ccCGGActttgcc
Nuclear respiratory factor 1	759	775	-	ccggGCGCgggcgcggg
RNA polymerase II transcription factor	886	892	-	ccgCGCC

Possible Stem Loops The 5' UTR has two possible stem loops. These are located from 279-303 and 342-372. In the 3' UTR, there is a possible stem loop located from 1487-1502.

microRNA Binding Sites There is one miRNA binding site in the 3' UTR as predicted using TargetScan. This miRNA, hsa-miR-4782-3p, may play a role in breast cancer.

=== Protein level ===
TMEM98 has 4 predicted glycation sites at amino acids 44, 118, 120, and 133. There are serine phosphorylation sites at 60, 122, 124, 136, 145, and 191 and threonine phosphorylation sites at 55, 105, and 160. These sites are all on the N-terminus side of the transmembrane region and are inside the cytosol of the cell.

== Expression ==
TMEM98 is expressed highly in retina, adipose tissue, embryo, ovary, umbilical cord, uterus, prostate, large and small intestines, lung, medical olfactory epithelium, nasal organ, stomach, bladder, and adrenal gland tissues. It is expressed very low in fertilized egg, oocyte, B cell, skeletal muscle, tongue epidermis, and thymus tissues.

It is also more highly expressed later embryonic stages.

== Clinical aspects ==
Mutations in TMEM98 cause autosomal dominant nanophthalmos.
