= DCDC2 =

Protein-coding gene in humans

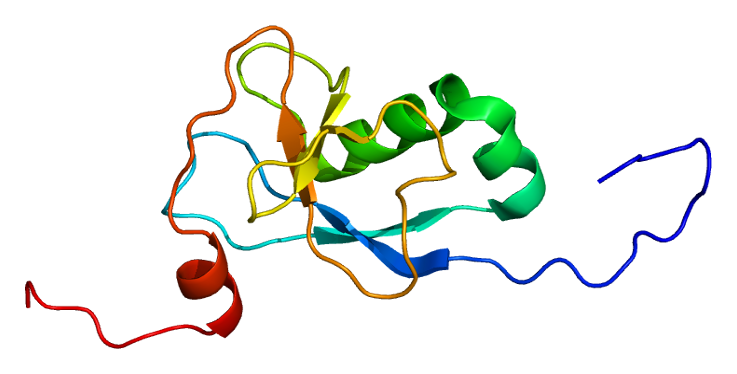

Identifiers
- Aliases: DCDC2, DCDC2A, DFNB66, NPHP19, RU2, RU2S, doublecortin domain containing 2, NSC
- External IDs: OMIM: 605755; MGI: 2652818; GeneCards: DCDC2
Available structures
PDB	Ortholog search: PDBe RCSB
PDB	List of PDB id codes 2DNF

Gene location (Human)
Chr.	Chromosome 6 (human)
Band	6p22.3	Start	24,171,755 bp
Band	6p22.3	End	24,358,059 bp

Gene location (Mouse)
Chr.	Chromosome 13 (mouse)
Band	13|13 A3.1	Start	25,239,987 bp
Band	13|13 A3.1	End	25,394,689 bp
RNA expression pattern
Bgee	Human / Mouse (ortholog); Top expressed in: secondary oocyte; islet of Langerhans; caput epididymis; body of pancreas; human kidney; buccal mucosa cell; endometrium; bronchial epithelial cell; pancreatic epithelial cell; right uterine tube / Top expressed in: olfactory epithelium; efferent ductule; glomerulus; inner renal medulla; ventricular system; Epithelium of choroid plexus; medullary collecting duct; zygote; renal pelvis; pancreas; More reference expression data
BioGPS	n/a
Gene ontology
Molecular function	protein binding; kinesin binding
Cellular component	cytoplasm; axoneme; cell projection; kinocilium; cytoskeleton; cytosol; cilium; nucleoplasm; microtubule organizing center; microtubule cytoskeleton; mitotic spindle; microtubule; cortical actin cytoskeleton
Biological process	regulation of cilium assembly; cellular defense response; regulation of Wnt signaling pathway; intracellular signal transduction; neuron migration; cell projection organization; hearing; positive regulation of smoothened signaling pathway; nervous system development; cilium assembly; dendrite morphogenesis
Sources:Amigo / QuickGO
Orthologs
Databases	NCBI: entry; OMA: entry
Species	Human	Mouse
Entrez	51473	195208
Ensembl	ENSG00000146038	ENSMUSG00000035910
UniProt	Q9UHG0	Q5DU00
RefSeq (mRNA)	NM_016356; NM_001195610	NM_001195617; NM_177577
RefSeq (protein)	NP_001182539; NP_057440	NP_001182546; NP_808245
Location (UCSC)	Chr 6: 24.17 – 24.36 Mb	Chr 13: 25.24 – 25.39 Mb
PubMed search
- Wikidata
View/Edit Human	View/Edit Mouse

Doublecortin domain-containing protein 2 (DCDC2) is a protein that in humans is encoded by the DCDC2 gene.

== Function ==
This gene encodes a protein with two doublecortin peptide domains. This domain has been demonstrated to bind tubulin and enhance microtubule polymerization.

== Clinical significance ==
Mutations in this gene have been associated with reading disability (RD), also referred to as developmental dyslexia. But this is controverse since a recent study proposed that there is a "low likelihood of a direct deletion effect on reading skills." Changes in the DCDC2 gene are frequently found among dyslexics. Altered alleles often occur among children with reading and writing difficulties. The gene appears to have a strong linkage with the processing of speech information when writing.
