= NRCAM =

Protein-coding gene in the species Homo sapiens

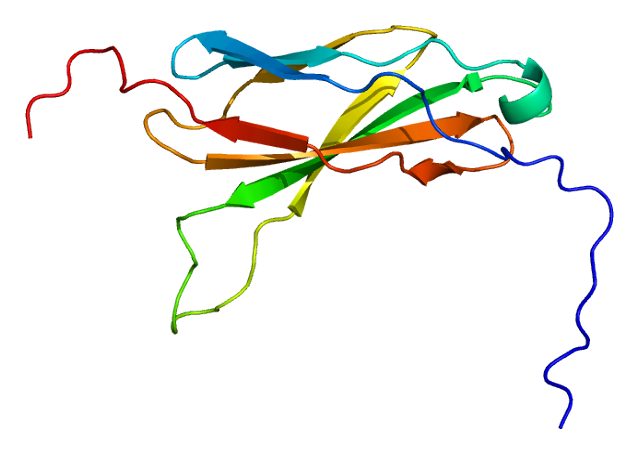

Identifiers
- Aliases: NRCAM, neuronal cell adhesion molecule
- External IDs: OMIM: 601581; MGI: 104750; GeneCards: NRCAM
Available structures
PDB	Ortholog search: PDBe RCSB
PDB	List of PDB id codes 1UEN, 1UEY

Gene location (Human)
Chr.	Chromosome 7 (human)
Band	7q31.1	Start	108,147,623 bp
Band	7q31.1	End	108,456,717 bp

Gene location (Mouse)
Chr.	Chromosome 12 (mouse)
Band	12 B2|12 20.71 cM	Start	44,328,885 bp
Band	12 B2|12 20.71 cM	End	44,601,964 bp
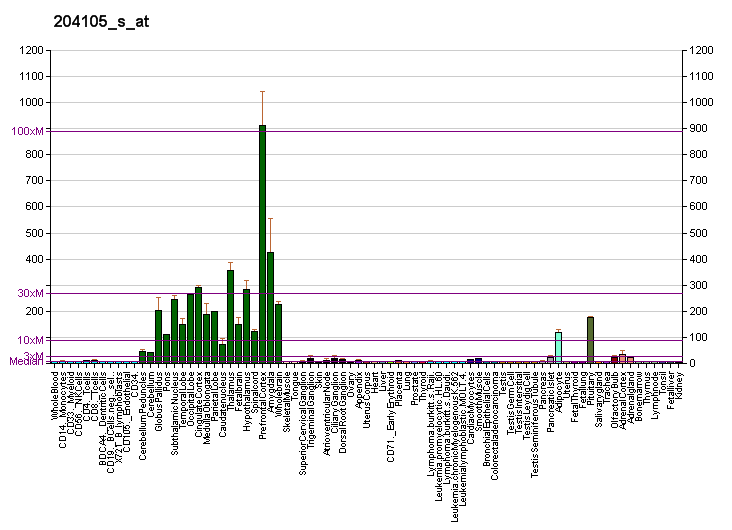

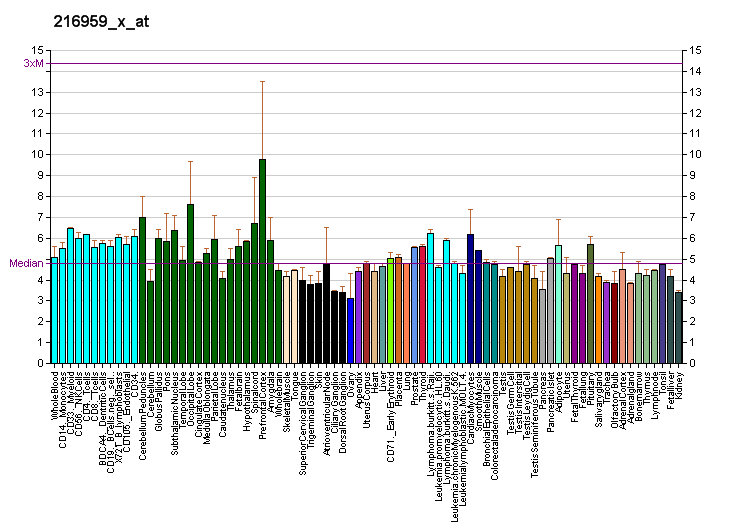
RNA expression pattern
Bgee	Human / Mouse (ortholog); Top expressed in: lateral nuclear group of thalamus; Brodmann area 23; middle temporal gyrus; primary visual cortex; Brodmann area 9; prefrontal cortex; superior frontal gyrus; entorhinal cortex; right frontal lobe; amygdala / Top expressed in: epithelium of lens; dentate gyrus of hippocampal formation granule cell; subiculum; primary visual cortex; medial dorsal nucleus; superior frontal gyrus; prefrontal cortex; anterior amygdaloid area; median eminence; arcuate nucleus; More reference expression data
BioGPS	More reference expression data
Gene ontology
Molecular function	protein binding; protein binding involved in heterotypic cell-cell adhesion; ankyrin binding
Cellular component	integral component of membrane; cell projection; membrane; plasma membrane; synapse; integral component of plasma membrane; extracellular region; axon; neuron projection; axon initial segment; external side of plasma membrane; glutamatergic synapse; integral component of postsynaptic membrane; integral component of postsynaptic density membrane
Biological process	protein localization; clustering of voltage-gated sodium channels; regulation of neuron projection development; regulation of axon extension; axonogenesis; heterotypic cell-cell adhesion; neuron migration; central nervous system development; cell adhesion; neuronal action potential propagation; angiogenesis; positive regulation of neuron differentiation; synapse assembly; axonal fasciculation; retinal ganglion cell axon guidance; axon guidance; cell-cell adhesion; regulation of postsynapse organization
Sources:Amigo / QuickGO
Orthologs
Databases	NCBI: entry; OMA: entry
Species	Human	Mouse
Entrez	4897	319504
Ensembl	ENSG00000091129	ENSMUSG00000020598
UniProt	Q92823	Q810U4
RefSeq (mRNA)	NM_001037132; NM_001037133; NM_001193582; NM_001193583; NM_001193584 NM_005010	NM_001146031; NM_176930
RefSeq (protein)	NP_001032209; NP_001180511; NP_001180512; NP_001180513; NP_005001 NP_001358048; NP_001358051; NP_001358052; NP_001358053; NP_001358054; NP_001358055; NP_001358056; NP_001358057; NP_001358058; NP_001358059; NP_001358060; NP_001358061; NP_001358062; NP_001358063; NP_001358064; NP_001358065; NP_001358066; NP_001358067; NP_001358068; NP_001358069; NP_001358070; NP_001358071; NP_001358072; NP_001358073; NP_001358074; NP_001358075; NP_001358076; NP_001358077; NP_001358078; NP_001358079; NP_001358080; NP_001358081; NP_001358082; NP_001358083; NP_001358084; NP_001358085; NP_001358086; NP_001358087; NP_001358088; NP_001358089; NP_001358090; NP_001358091; NP_001358092; NP_001358093; NP_001358094; NP_001358095; NP_001358096; NP_001358097; NP_001358098; NP_001358099; NP_001358100; NP_001358101; NP_001358102; NP_001358103; NP_001358104; NP_001358105; NP_001358106; NP_001358107; NP_001358108; NP_001358109; NP_001358110; NP_001358111	NP_001139503; NP_795904
Location (UCSC)	Chr 7: 108.15 – 108.46 Mb	Chr 12: 44.33 – 44.6 Mb
PubMed search
- Wikidata
View/Edit Human	View/Edit Mouse

Neuronal cell adhesion molecule is a protein that in humans is encoded by the NRCAM gene.

Cell adhesion molecules (CAMs) are members of the immunoglobulin superfamily. This gene encodes a neuronal cell adhesion molecule with multiple immunoglobulin-like C2-type domains and fibronectin type-III domains. This ankyrin-binding protein is involved in neuron-neuron adhesion and promotes directional signaling during axonal cone growth. This gene is also expressed in non-neural tissues and may play a general role in cell-cell communication via signaling from its intracellular domain to the actin cytoskeleton during directional cell migration. Allelic variants of this gene have been associated with autism and addiction vulnerability. Alternative splicing results in multiple transcript variants encoding different isoforms.
