= Blood-group-substance endo-1,4-beta-galactosidase =

Class of enzymes

Blood-group-substance endo-1,4-β-galactosidase

Identifiers
- EC no.: 3.2.1.102
- CAS no.: 52720-51-1

Databases
- IntEnz: IntEnz view
- BRENDA: BRENDA entry
- ExPASy: NiceZyme view
- KEGG: KEGG entry
- MetaCyc: metabolic pathway
- PRIAM: profile
- PDB structures: RCSB PDB PDBe PDBsum
Search
- PMC: articles
- PubMed: articles
- NCBI: proteins

Blood-group-substance endo-1,4-β-galactosidase (EC 3.2.1.102, endo-β-galactosidase, blood-group-substance 1,4-β-D-galactanohydrolase) is an enzyme with systematic name blood-group-substance 4-β-D-galactanohydrolase. It catalyses endohydrolysis of (1→4)-β-D-galactosidic linkages in blood group A and B substances.

It hydrolyses the 1,4-β-D-galactosyl linkages adjacent to a 1,3-α-D-galactosyl or N-acetylgalactosaminyl residues and a 1,2-α-D-fucosyl residue.
