= SFRP5 =

Protein-coding gene in the species Homo sapiens

Identifiers
- Aliases: SFRP5, SARP3, secreted frizzled related protein 5
- External IDs: OMIM: 604158; MGI: 1860298; HomoloGene: 2268; GeneCards: SFRP5; OMA:SFRP5 - orthologs

Gene location (Human)
Chr.	Chromosome 10 (human)
Band	10q24.2	Start	97,766,751 bp
Band	10q24.2	End	97,771,999 bp

Gene location (Mouse)
Chr.	Chromosome 19 (mouse)
Band	19|19 C3	Start	42,186,410 bp
Band	19|19 C3	End	42,190,691 bp
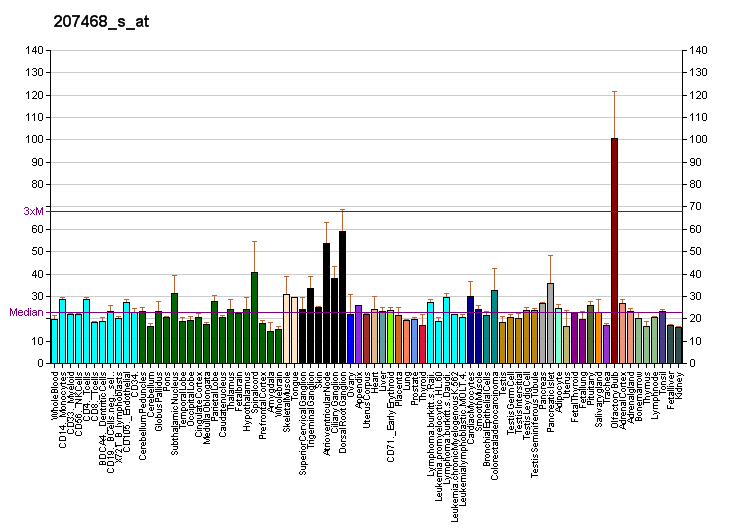
RNA expression pattern
Bgee	Human / Mouse (ortholog); Top expressed in: retinal pigment epithelium; tibial nerve; body of pancreas; sural nerve; right auricle of heart; cardiac muscle tissue of right atrium; muscle layer of sigmoid colon; olfactory bulb; cartilage tissue; duodenum / Top expressed in: sciatic nerve; decidua; gastrula; vestibular sensory epithelium; lumbar spinal ganglion; lacrimal gland; islet of Langerhans; parotid gland; retinal pigment epithelium; white adipose tissue; More reference expression data
BioGPS	More reference expression data
Gene ontology
Molecular function	G protein-coupled receptor activity; Wnt-protein binding; Wnt-activated receptor activity
Cellular component	extracellular region; extracellular space; integral component of membrane
Biological process	cell differentiation; negative regulation of protein kinase B signaling; negative regulation of Wnt signaling pathway; anatomical structure morphogenesis; Wnt signaling pathway; negative regulation of DNA-binding transcription factor activity; multicellular organism development; establishment or maintenance of cell polarity; negative regulation of Wnt signaling pathway involved in digestive tract morphogenesis; negative regulation of canonical Wnt signaling pathway; signal transduction; visual perception; negative regulation of cell population proliferation; apoptotic process; regulation of Wnt signaling pathway; regulation of BMP signaling pathway; G protein-coupled receptor signaling pathway; non-canonical Wnt signaling pathway; canonical Wnt signaling pathway
Sources:Amigo / QuickGO
Orthologs
Species	Human	Mouse
Entrez	6425	54612
Ensembl	ENSG00000120057	ENSMUSG00000018822
UniProt	Q5T4F7	Q9WU66
RefSeq (mRNA)	NM_003015	NM_018780
RefSeq (protein)	NP_003006	NP_061250
Location (UCSC)	Chr 10: 97.77 – 97.77 Mb	Chr 19: 42.19 – 42.19 Mb
PubMed search
- Wikidata
View/Edit Human	View/Edit Mouse

Secreted frizzled-related protein 5 is a protein that in humans is encoded by the SFRP5 gene.

Secreted frizzled-related protein 5 (SFRP5) is a member of the SFRP family that contains a cysteine-rich domain homologous to the putative Wnt-binding site of Frizzled proteins. SFRPs act as soluble modulators of Wnt signaling. SFRP5 and SFRP1 may be involved in determining the polarity of photoreceptor cells in the retina. SFRP5 is highly expressed in the retinal pigment epithelium, and moderately expressed in the pancreas.
