= Fibromodulin =

Protein

FMOD

Identifiers
- Aliases: FMOD, FM, SLRR2E, fibromodulin
- External IDs: OMIM: 600245; MGI: 1328364; GeneCards: FMOD

Gene location (Human)
Chr.	Chromosome 1 (human)
Band	1q32.1	Start	203,340,628 bp
Band	1q32.1	End	203,351,758 bp

Gene location (Mouse)
Chr.	Chromosome 1 (mouse)
Band	1 E4|1 58.09 cM	Start	133,964,992 bp
Band	1 E4|1 58.09 cM	End	133,976,015 bp
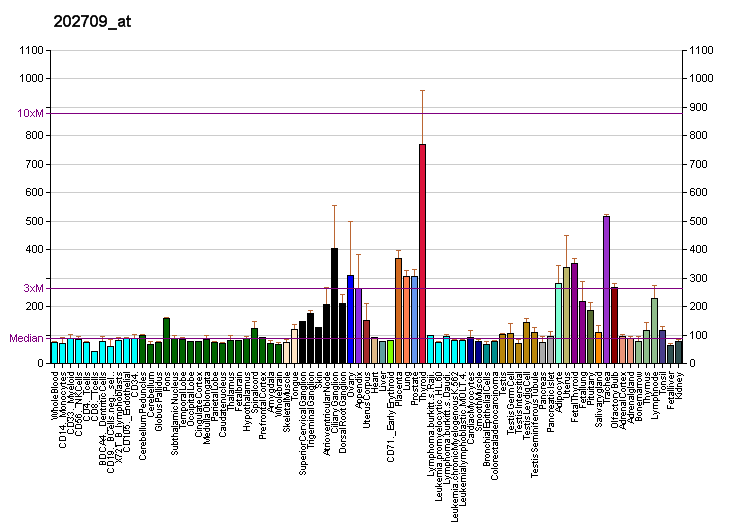
RNA expression pattern
Bgee	Human / Mouse (ortholog); Top expressed in: Achilles tendon; tibia; cartilage tissue; right coronary artery; ascending aorta; Descending thoracic aorta; left coronary artery; popliteal artery; tibial arteries; synovial joint / Top expressed in: calvaria; ciliary body; body of femur; ankle; skin of external ear; semi-lunar valve; aortic valve; ankle joint; iris; conjunctival fornix; More reference expression data
BioGPS	More reference expression data
Gene ontology
Molecular function	heparin binding; Roundabout binding; extracellular matrix structural constituent conferring compression resistance
Cellular component	Golgi lumen; extracellular matrix; lysosomal lumen; extracellular space; extracellular region; collagen-containing extracellular matrix
Biological process	transforming growth factor beta receptor complex assembly; keratan sulfate biosynthetic process; keratan sulfate catabolic process; axonogenesis; collagen fibril organization
Sources:Amigo / QuickGO
Orthologs
Databases	NCBI: entry; OMA: entry
Species	Human	Mouse
Entrez	2331	14264
Ensembl	ENSG00000122176	ENSMUSG00000041559
UniProt	Q06828	P50608
RefSeq (mRNA)	NM_002023	NM_021355
RefSeq (protein)	NP_002014	NP_067330
Location (UCSC)	Chr 1: 203.34 – 203.35 Mb	Chr 1: 133.96 – 133.98 Mb
PubMed search
- Wikidata
View/Edit Human	View/Edit Mouse

Fibromodulin is a protein that in humans is encoded by the FMOD gene.

Fibromodulin is a 42kDa protein of a family of small interstitial leucine-rich repeat proteoglycans (SLRPs). It can have up to four N-linked keratan sulfate chains attached to the core protein within the leucine-rich region. It shares significant sequence homology with biglycan and decorin.

== Function ==
Fibromodulin participates in the assembly of the collagen fibers of the extracellular matrix. It binds to the same site on the collagen type I molecule as lumican. It also inhibits fibrillogenesis of collagen type I and collagen type III in vitro. It regulates TGF-beta activities by sequestering TGF-beta into the extracellular matrix.

== Clinical significance ==
There is an age-dependent decline in the synthesis of keratan sulfate chains, so non-glycated forms of fibromodulin can accumulate in tissues such as cartilage.

Fibromodulin is found in the epidermis of human skin and is expressed by skin cells (keratinocytes) in culture. Mice with the gene for fibromodulin knocked out (Fmod-/-) have very fragile skin and abnormal tail and Achilles tendons. The collagen fiber bundles in these tendons are fewer and disorganised and there is less endotenon surrounding the tendon tissue. The levels of lumican, a SLRP with one of the same collagen binding sites as fibromodulin, is increased 4 fold in the tail tendons of Fmod-knockout mice.
