= Keratan sulfate =

Class of chemical compounds

Chemical structure of keratan sulfate

Keratan sulfate (KS), also called keratosulfate, is any of several sulfated glycosaminoglycans (structural carbohydrates) that have been found especially in the cornea, cartilage, and bone. It is also synthesized in the central nervous system where it participates both in development and in the glial scar formation following an injury. Keratan sulfates are large, highly hydrated molecules which in joints can act as a cushion to absorb mechanical shock.

== Structure ==
Like other glycosaminoglycans keratan sulfate is a linear polymer that consists of a repeating disaccharide unit. Keratan sulfate occurs as a proteoglycan (PG) in which KS chains are attached to cell-surface or extracellular matrix proteins, termed core proteins. KS core proteins include lumican, keratocan, mimecan, fibromodulin, PRELP, osteoadherin, and aggrecan.

The basic repeating disaccharide unit within keratan sulfate is -3Galβ1-4GlcNAc6Sβ1-. This can be sulfated at carbon position 6 (C6) of either or both the Gal or GlcNAc monosaccharides. However, the detailed primary structure of specific KS types are best considered to be composed of three regions:

- A linkage region, at one end of which the KS chain is linked to the core protein.
- A repeat region, composed of the -3Galβ1-4GlcNAcβ1- repeating disaccharide unit and
- A chain capping region, occurring at the opposite end of the KS chain to the protein linkage region.

The monosaccharide mannose is found within the linkage region of keratan sulfate type I (KSI). Disaccharides within the repeating region of KSII may be fucosylated and N-Acetylneuraminic acid caps the end of all keratan sulfate type II (KSII) chains and up to 70% of KSI type chains.

=== KS classes ===
The designations KSI and KSII were originally assigned on the basis of the tissue type from which the keratan sulfate was isolated. KSI was isolated from corneal tissue and KSII from skeletal tissue. Minor monosaccharide compositional differences exist between KS extracted from both sources and even KS extracted from the same source. However, major differences occur in the way each KS type is joined to its core protein. The designations KSI and KSII are now based upon these protein linkage differences. KSI is N-linked to specific asparagine amino acids via N-acetylglucosamine and KSII is O-linked to specific serine or threonine amino acids via N-acetylgalactosamine. The tissue based classification of KS no longer exists as KS types have been shown to be non tissue specific. A third type of KS (KSIII) has also been isolated from brain tissue that is O-linked to specific serine or threonine amino acids via mannose.

=== Corneal KSI ===
The amount of KS found in the cornea is 10 fold higher than it is in cartilage and 2-4 times higher than it is in other tissues. It is produced by corneal keratocytes and is thought to play a role of a dynamic buffer of corneal hydration. In a rare progressive disorder called macular corneal dystrophy (MCDC), the synthesis of keratan sulfate is either absent (MCDC type I) or abnormal (MCDC type II).

=== Non-corneal KSI ===
Osteoadherin, fibromodulin, and PRELP are core proteins found in bone and cartilage, that are modified by N-linked KS chains. Osteoadherin and Fibromodulin linked KS chains are shorter than those found in the cornea, typically 8-9 disaccharide units in length. Whereas corneal KSI is composed of a number of domains showing variable degrees of sulphation the longest of which may be 8-32 disaccharide units in length. The non-reducing terminal of Fibromodulin KS is more similar in structure to the non-reducing terminal of a KSII type keratan sulphate rather than to corneal KSI. KS structure is therefore believed to be determined by the tissue specific availability of glycosyltransferases rather than linkage type to the core protein.

=== KSII ===
Cartilage KSII is almost entirely sulphated, consisting of disulphated monomers interrupted occasionally by a single monosulphated lactosamine monomer. Fucosylation is also common with alpha-linked fucose present at the carbon 3 position of sulphated GlcNAc, except in the case of tracheal KSII where this feature is absent.

== See also ==
- N-Acetylglucosamine
- Galactose
- Lumican
- Morquio syndrome is marked by the accumulation of KS
- Proteoglycan 4
