= Corneal pachymetry =

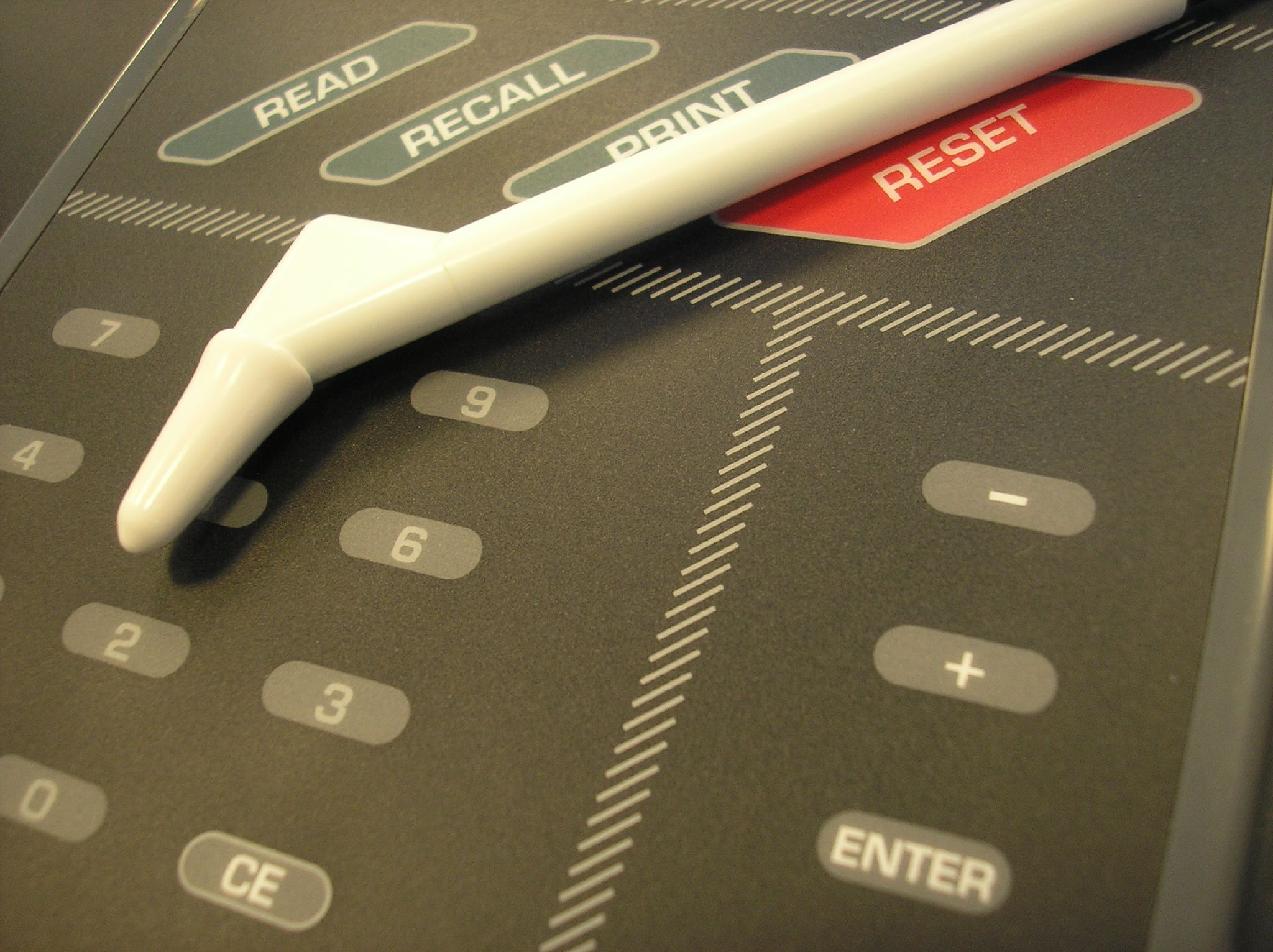
- A typical ultrasound pachymeter

Corneal pachymetry is the process of measuring the thickness of the cornea. A pachymeter is a medical device used to measure the thickness of the eye's cornea. It is used to perform corneal pachymetry prior to refractive surgery, for Keratoconus screening, LRI surgery and is useful in screening for patients suspected of developing glaucoma among other uses.

== Process ==
It can be done using either ultrasonic or optical methods. The contact methods, such as ultrasound and optical such as confocal microscopy (CONFOSCAN), or noncontact methods such as optical biometry with a single Scheimpflug camera (such as SIRIUS or PENTACAM), or a Dual Scheimpflug camera (such as GALILEI), or Optical Coherence Tomography (OCT, such as Visante) and online Optical Coherence Pachymetry (OCP, such as ORBSCAN). Corneal Pachymetry is essential prior to a refractive surgery procedure for ensuring sufficient corneal thickness to prevent abnormal bulging of the cornea, a side effect known as ectasia.

== Pachymeters ==
The instrument used for this purpose is known as a pachymeter. Conventional pachymeters are devices that display the thickness of the cornea, usually in micrometres, when the ultrasonic transducer touches the cornea. Newer generations of ultrasonic pachymeters work by way of Corneal Waveform (CWF). Using this technology the user can capture an ultra-high definition echogram of the cornea, somewhat like a corneal A-scan. Pachymetry using the corneal waveform process allows the user to more accurately measure the corneal thickness, verify the reliability of the measurements that were obtained, superimpose corneal waveforms to monitor changes in a patient's cornea over time, and measure structures within the cornea such as micro bubbles created during femto-second laser flap cuts.

== Indications ==
Corneal pachymetry is essential for other corneal surgeries such as Limbal Relaxing Incisions. LRI is used to reduce corneal astigmatism by placing a pair of incisions of a particular depth and arc length at a steep axis of corneal astigmatism. By using the corneal pachymetry the surgeon will reduce the chances of perforation of the eye and improves surgical outcome. Newer generations of pachymeters will help surgeons by providing graphical surgical plans to eliminate astigmatism.

Corneal pachymetry is also considered an important test in the early detection of glaucoma. In 2002, the five-year report of the Ocular Hypertension Study (OHTS) was released. The study reported that corneal thickness as measured by corneal pachymetry was an accurate predictor of glaucoma development when combined with standard measurements of intraocular pressure. As a result of this study and others that followed, corneal pachymetry is now widely used by both glaucoma researchers and glaucoma specialists to better diagnose and detect early cases. Newer generation pachymeters have the ability to adjust the intraocular pressure that is measured according to the corneal thickness.

== Technology ==
Modern devices use ultrasound technology, while earlier models were based on optical principles. The ultrasonic Pachymeters traditionally have been devices that provide the thickness of the human cornea in the form of a number in micrometres that is displayed to the user. The newer generation of ultrasonic pachymeters work by way of Corneal Waveform (CWF). Using this technology the user can capture an ultra high definition echogram of cornea, think of it as a corneal A-scan. Pachymetry using the corneal waveform allows the user to more accurately measure the corneal thickness, have the ability to check the reliability of the measurements that were obtained, have the ability to superimpose corneal waveform to monitor the change of patients cornea over time, and ability to measure structures within the cornea such as micro bubbles created in the cornea during femto-second laser flap cut.
