= Prolargin =

Protein found in humans

PRELP

Identifiers
- Aliases: PRELP, MST161, MSTP161, SLRR2A, proline/arginine-rich end leucine-rich repeat protein, proline and arginine rich end leucine rich repeat protein
- External IDs: OMIM: 601914; MGI: 2151110; GeneCards: PRELP

Gene location (Human)
Chr.	Chromosome 1 (human)
Band	1q32.1	Start	203,475,806 bp
Band	1q32.1	End	203,491,352 bp

Gene location (Mouse)
Chr.	Chromosome 1 (mouse)
Band	1 E4|1 58.02 cM	Start	133,838,042 bp
Band	1 E4|1 58.02 cM	End	133,849,152 bp
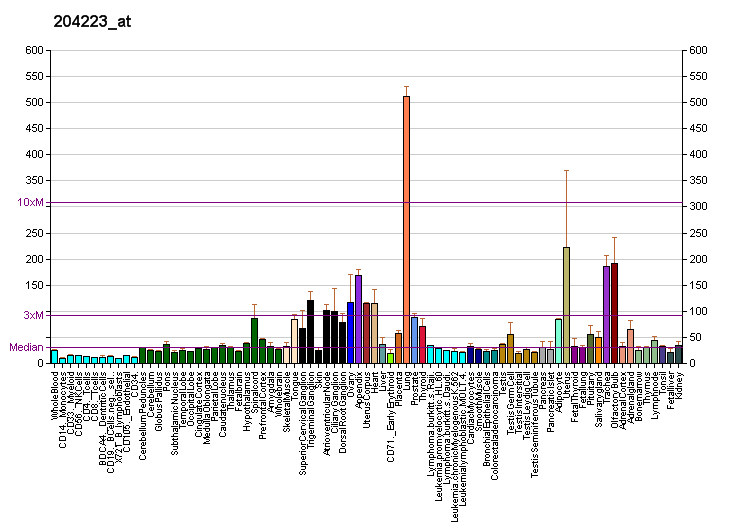

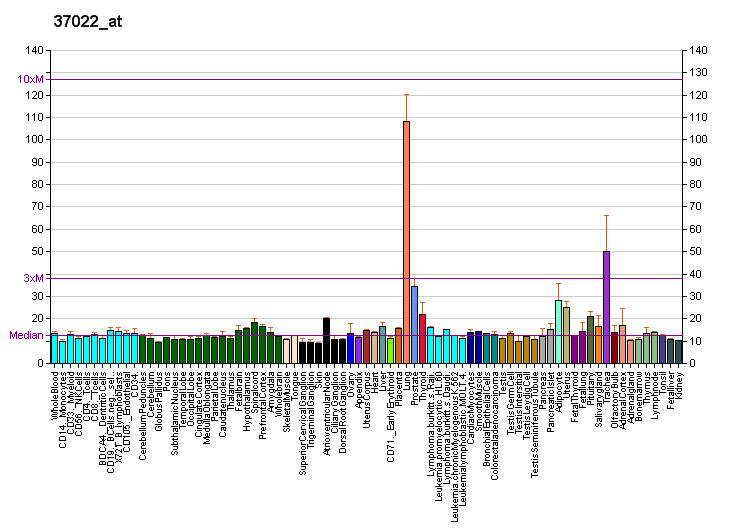
RNA expression pattern
Bgee	Human / Mouse (ortholog); Top expressed in: saphenous vein; right coronary artery; synovial joint; popliteal artery; ascending aorta; tibial arteries; pericardium; Descending thoracic aorta; left coronary artery; tibia / Top expressed in: ankle; aortic valve; brown adipose tissue; white adipose tissue; right lung; calvaria; ascending aorta; sciatic nerve; right lung lobe; Epithelium of choroid plexus; More reference expression data
BioGPS	More reference expression data
Gene ontology
Molecular function	heparin binding; extracellular matrix structural constituent; extracellular matrix structural constituent conferring compression resistance
Cellular component	extracellular matrix; Golgi lumen; extracellular vesicle; lysosomal lumen; extracellular exosome; extracellular space; extracellular region; collagen-containing extracellular matrix
Biological process	skeletal system development; keratan sulfate biosynthetic process; keratan sulfate catabolic process; axonogenesis
Sources:Amigo / QuickGO
Orthologs
Databases	NCBI: entry; OMA: entry
Species	Human	Mouse
Entrez	5549	116847
Ensembl	ENSG00000188783	ENSMUSG00000041577
UniProt	P51888	Q9JK53
RefSeq (mRNA)	NM_201348; NM_002725	NM_054077
RefSeq (protein)	NP_002716; NP_958505	NP_473418
Location (UCSC)	Chr 1: 203.48 – 203.49 Mb	Chr 1: 133.84 – 133.85 Mb
PubMed search
- Wikidata
View/Edit Human	View/Edit Mouse

Prolargin is a protein that in humans is encoded by the PRELP gene.

The protein encoded by this gene is a leucine-rich repeat protein present in connective tissue extracellular matrix. This protein functions as a molecule anchoring basement membranes to the underlying connective tissue. This protein has been shown to bind type I collagen to basement membranes and type II collagen to cartilage. It also binds the basement membrane heparan sulfate proteoglycan perlecan. This protein is suggested to be involved in the pathogenesis of Hutchinson–Gilford progeria (HGP), which is reported to lack the binding of collagen in basement membranes and cartilage. Alternatively spliced transcript variants encoding the same protein have been observed.
