= Osteoglycin =

Protein-coding gene in the species Homo sapiens

OGN

Identifiers
- Aliases: OGN, OG, OIF, SLRR3A, osteoglycin
- External IDs: OMIM: 602383; MGI: 109278; GeneCards: OGN

Gene location (Human)
Chr.	Chromosome 9 (human)
Band	9q22.31	Start	92,383,268 bp
Band	9q22.31	End	92,404,696 bp

Gene location (Mouse)
Chr.	Chromosome 13 (mouse)
Band	13|13 A5	Start	49,761,522 bp
Band	13|13 A5	End	49,777,977 bp
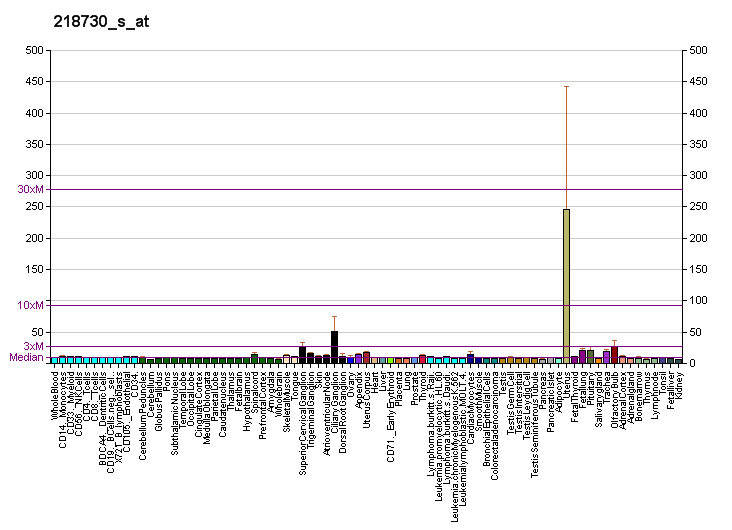
RNA expression pattern
Bgee	Human / Mouse (ortholog); Top expressed in: right coronary artery; Descending thoracic aorta; parietal pleura; ascending aorta; gallbladder; decidua; left coronary artery; tendon of biceps brachii; cartilage tissue; vena cava / Top expressed in: tunica media of zone of aorta; sciatic nerve; calvaria; epithelium of lens; ciliary body; cervix; left lung; carotid body; efferent ductule; external carotid artery; More reference expression data
BioGPS	More reference expression data
Gene ontology
Molecular function	protein binding; growth factor activity; extracellular matrix structural constituent conferring compression resistance
Cellular component	extracellular vesicle; extracellular matrix; lysosomal lumen; Golgi lumen; extracellular exosome; extracellular space; extracellular region; collagen-containing extracellular matrix
Biological process	negative regulation of smooth muscle cell proliferation; axonogenesis; keratan sulfate catabolic process; keratan sulfate biosynthetic process; regulation of signaling receptor activity; signal transduction
Sources:Amigo / QuickGO
Orthologs
Databases	NCBI: entry; OMA: entry
Species	Human	Mouse
Entrez	4969	18295
Ensembl	ENSG00000106809	ENSMUSG00000021390
UniProt	P20774	Q62000
RefSeq (mRNA)	NM_033014; NM_014057; NM_024416	NM_008760
RefSeq (protein)	NP_054776; NP_077727; NP_148935; NP_054776.1; NP_148935.1	NP_032786
Location (UCSC)	Chr 9: 92.38 – 92.4 Mb	Chr 13: 49.76 – 49.78 Mb
PubMed search
- Wikidata
View/Edit Human	View/Edit Mouse

Osteoglycin (also called mimecan), encoded by the OGN gene, is a human protein.

This gene encodes a protein which induces ectopic bone formation in conjunction with transforming growth factor beta. This protein is a small keratan sulfate proteoglycan which contains tandem leucine-rich repeats (LRR). The gene expresses three transcript variants.

The level of expression of this gene has been correlated with enlarged hearts and more specifically left ventricular hypertrophy.
