= Osteomodulin =

Protein-coding gene in the species Homo sapiens

OMD

Identifiers
- Aliases: OMD, OSAD, SLRR2C, osteomodulin, osteoadherin, osteoadherin proteoglycan
- External IDs: MGI: 1350918; GeneCards: OMD

Gene location (Human)
Chr.	Chromosome 9 (human)
Band	9q22.31	Start	92,412,380 bp
Band	9q22.31	End	92,424,471 bp

Gene location (Mouse)
Chr.	Chromosome 13 (mouse)
Band	13|13 A5	Start	49,735,938 bp
Band	13|13 A5	End	49,746,298 bp
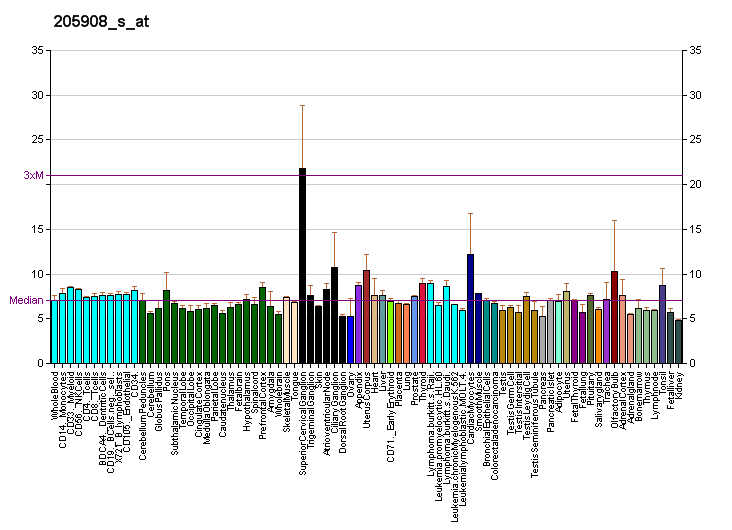

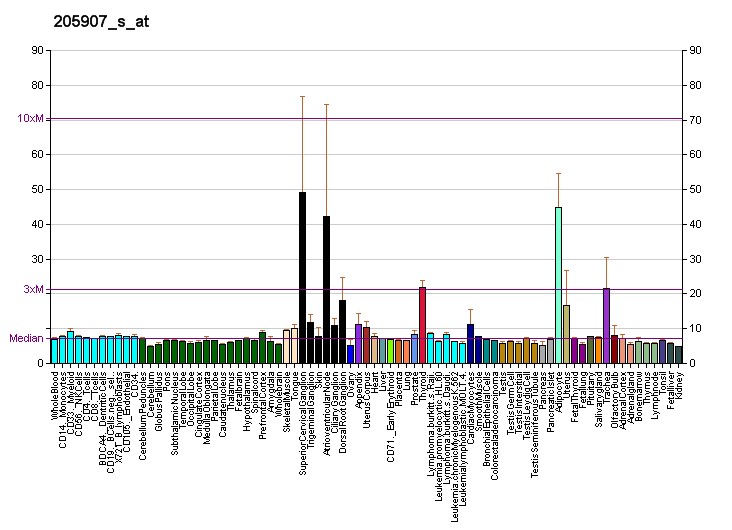
RNA expression pattern
Bgee	Human / Mouse (ortholog); Top expressed in: periodontal fiber; right coronary artery; thoracic aorta; ascending aorta; Descending thoracic aorta; tibia; Achilles tendon; left coronary artery; decidua; popliteal artery / Top expressed in: calvaria; intercostal muscle; molar; body of femur; skin of external ear; olfactory epithelium; trachea; ankle; fossa; lumbar spinal ganglion; More reference expression data
BioGPS	More reference expression data
Orthologs
Databases	NCBI: entry; OMA: entry
Species	Human	Mouse
Entrez	4958	27047
Ensembl	ENSG00000127083	ENSMUSG00000048368
UniProt	Q99983	O35103
RefSeq (mRNA)	NM_005014	NM_012050; NM_001360708
RefSeq (protein)	NP_005005	NP_036180; NP_001347637
Location (UCSC)	Chr 9: 92.41 – 92.42 Mb	Chr 13: 49.74 – 49.75 Mb
PubMed search
- Wikidata
View/Edit Human	View/Edit Mouse

Osteomodulin (also called osteoadherin or osteoadherin proteoglycan) is a protein that in humans is encoded by the OMD gene.
