= Glycoside hydrolase family 89 =

Alpha-N-acetylglucosaminidase (NAGLU) tim-barrel domain

Identifiers
- Symbol: NAGLU
- Pfam: PF05089
- Pfam clan: CL0058
- InterPro: IPR007781
- CAZy: GH89
Available protein structures:
- PDB: IPR007781 PF05089 (ECOD; PDBsum)
- AlphaFold: IPR007781; PF05089

Alpha-N-acetylglucosaminidase (NAGLU) N-terminal domain

Identifiers
- Symbol: NAGLU_N
- Pfam: PF12971
- CAZy: GH89
Available protein structures:
- PDB: PF12971 (ECOD; PDBsum)
- AlphaFold: PF12971

Alpha-N-acetylglucosaminidase (NAGLU) C-terminal domain

Identifiers
- Symbol: NAGLU_C
- Pfam: PF12972
- CAZy: GH89
Available protein structures:
- PDB: PF12972 (ECOD; PDBsum)
- AlphaFold: PF12972

In molecular biology, glycoside hydrolase family 89 is a family of glycoside hydrolases.

Glycoside hydrolases EC 3.2.1. are a widespread group of enzymes that hydrolyse the glycosidic bond between two or more carbohydrates, or between a carbohydrate and a non-carbohydrate moiety. A classification system for glycoside hydrolases, based on sequence similarity, has led to the definition of >100 different families. This classification is available on the CAZy web site, and also discussed at CAZypedia, an online encyclopedia of carbohydrate active enzymes.

Glycoside hydrolase family 89 CAZY GH_89 includes enzymes with α-N-acetylglucosaminidase EC 3.2.1.50 activity. The enzyme consist of three structural domains, the N-terminal domain has an alpha-beta fold, the central domain has a TIM barrel fold, and the C-terminal domain has an all alpha helical fold.

Alpha-N-acetylglucosaminidase is a lysosomal enzyme required for the stepwise degradation of heparan sulphate. Mutations on the alpha-N-acetylglucosaminidase (NAGLU) gene can lead to Mucopolysaccharidosis type IIIB (MPS IIIB; or Sanfilippo syndrome type B) characterised by neurological dysfunction but relatively mild somatic manifestations.
