= Hurler–Scheie syndrome =

Autosomal recessive genetic condition

Hurler-Scheie syndrome
- Other names: Mucopolysaccharidosis type I H-S
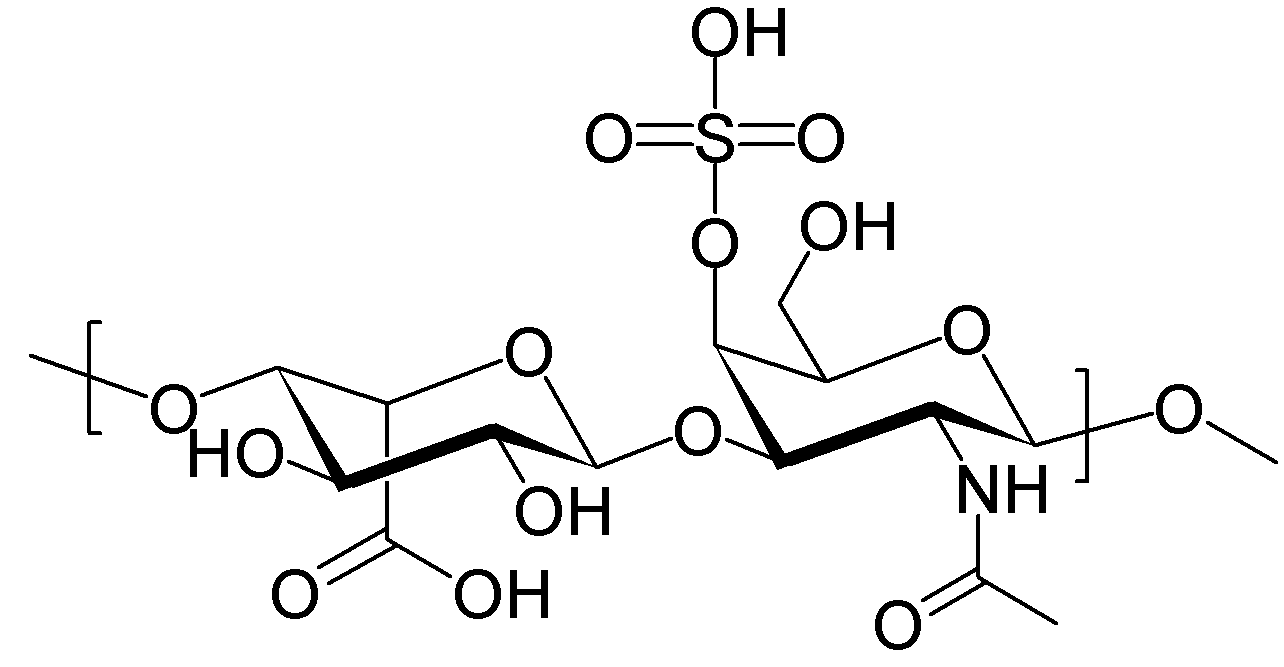
- Structure of dermatan sulfate, one of the molecules that accumulates in the lysosomes of MPS I patients
- Usual onset: Age 3-8 years
- Causes: Deficiency of the alpha-L iduronidase enzyme
- Differential diagnosis: Other forms of MPS I; Hunter syndrome; other mucopolysaccharidoses
- Treatment: Enzyme replacement therapy with iduronidase; surgery
- Prognosis: Life expectancy is generally into the late teens or early 20s, but may vary depending on the severity of the disease
- Frequency: 1:115,000 (Hurler-Scheie syndrome/intermediate)

Hurler–Scheie syndrome is a genetic disorder caused by the buildup of glycosaminoglycans (GAGs) in various organ tissues. It is a cutaneous condition, also characterized by mild intellectual disability and corneal clouding. Respiratory problems, sleep apnea, and heart disease may develop in adolescence.

Hurler–Scheie syndrome is classified as a lysosomal storage disease. Patients with Hurler–Scheie syndrome lack the ability to break down GAGs in their lysosomes due a deficiency of the enzyme iduronidase.

All forms of mucopolysaccharidosis type I (MPS I) are a spectrum of the same disease. Hurler-Sheie is the subtype of MPS I with intermediate severity. Hurler syndrome is the most severe form, while Scheie syndrome is the least severe form. Some clinicians consider the differences between Hurler, Hurler-Scheie, and Scheie syndromes to be arbitrary. Instead, they classify these patients as having "severe", "intermediate", or "attenuated" MPS I.

== See also ==
- Mucopolysaccharidosis
