= Mucopolysaccharidosis =

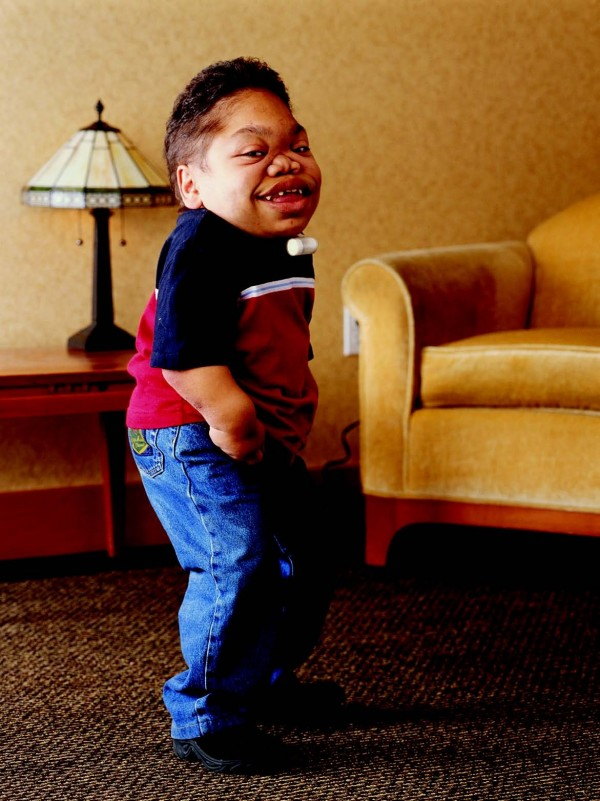
- A 16-year-old male with rapidly progressing MPS-VI, showing characteristic facial features and skeletal abnormalities
- Specialty: Endocrinology

Mucopolysaccharidoses are a group of metabolic disorders caused by the absence or malfunctioning of lysosomal enzymes needed to break down molecules called glycosaminoglycans (GAGs). These long chains of sugar carbohydrates occur within the cells that help build bone, cartilage, tendons, corneas, skin and connective tissue. GAGs (formerly called mucopolysaccharides) are also found in the fluids that lubricate joints.

Individuals with mucopolysaccharidosis either do not produce enough of one of the eleven enzymes required to break down these sugar chains into simpler molecules, or they produce enzymes that do not work properly. Over time, these GAGs collect in the cells, blood and connective tissues. The result is permanent, progressive cellular damage which affects appearance, physical abilities, organ and system functioning.

The mucopolysaccharidoses are part of the lysosomal storage disease family, a group of genetic disorders that result when the lysosome organelle in animal cells malfunctions. The lysosome can be thought of as the cell's recycling center because it processes unwanted material into other substances that the cell can utilize. Lysosomes break down this unwanted matter via enzymes, highly specialized proteins essential for survival. Lysosomal disorders like mucopolysaccharidosis are triggered when a particular enzyme exists in too small an amount or is missing altogether.

== Signs and symptoms ==
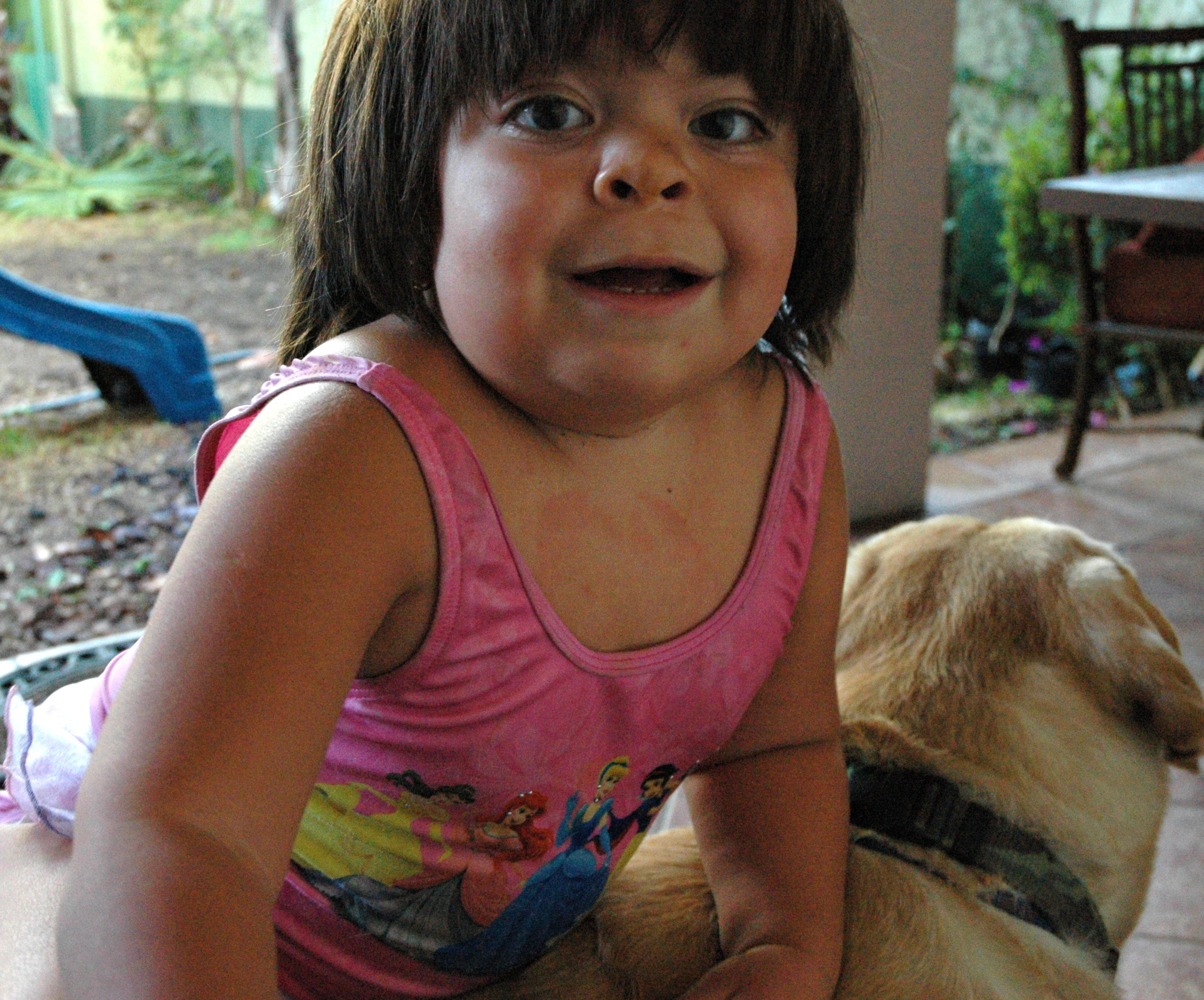
A child with an unspecified MPS disorder, showing characteristic facial features

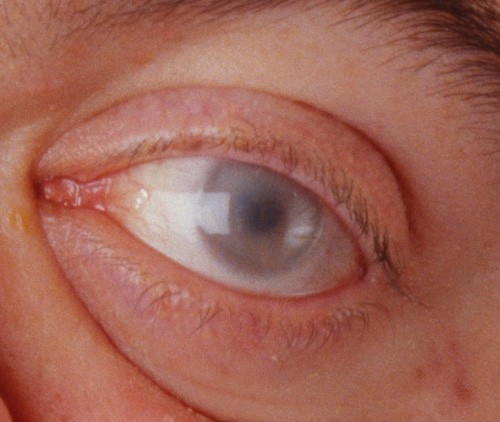
Corneal clouding in a 30-year-old male with MPS-VI. Several other MPS disorders may also present with corneal clouding.

The mucopolysaccharidoses share many clinical features but have varying degrees of severity. These features may not be apparent at birth but progress as storage of GAGs affects bone, skeletal structure, connective tissues, and organs. Neurological complications may include damage to neurons (which send and receive signals throughout the body) as well as pain and impaired motor function. This results from compression of nerves or nerve roots in the spinal cord or in the peripheral nervous system, the part of the nervous system that connects the brain and spinal cord to sensory organs such as the eyes and to other organs, muscles, and tissues throughout the body.

Depending on the mucopolysaccharidosis subtype, affected individuals may have normal intellect or have cognitive impairments, may experience developmental delay, or may have severe behavioral problems. Many individuals have hearing loss, either conductive (in which pressure behind the eardrum causes fluid from the lining of the middle ear to build up and eventually congeal), neurosensory (in which tiny hair cells in the inner ear are damaged), or both. Communicating hydrocephalus—in which the normal reabsorption of cerebrospinal fluid is blocked and causes increased pressure inside the head—is common in some of the mucopolysaccharidoses. Surgically inserting a shunt into the brain can drain fluid. The eye's cornea often becomes cloudy from intracellular storage, and glaucoma and degeneration of the retina also may affect the patient's vision.

Physical symptoms generally include coarse or rough facial features (including a flat nasal bridge, thick lips, and enlarged mouth and tongue), short stature with disproportionately short trunk (dwarfism), dysplasia (abnormal bone size and/or shape) and other skeletal irregularities, thickened skin, enlarged organs such as liver (hepatomegaly) or spleen (splenomegaly), hernias, and excessive body hair growth. Short and often claw-like hands, progressive joint stiffness, and carpal tunnel syndrome can restrict hand mobility and function. Recurring respiratory infections are common, as are obstructive airway disease and obstructive sleep apnea. Many affected individuals also have heart disease, often involving enlarged or diseased heart valves.

Another lysosomal storage disease often confused with the mucopolysaccharidoses is mucolipidosis. In this disorder, excessive amounts of fatty materials known as lipids (another principal component of living cells) are stored, in addition to sugars. Persons with mucolipidosis may share some of the clinical features associated with the mucopolysaccharidoses (certain facial features, bony structure abnormalities, and damage to the brain), and increased amounts of the enzymes needed to break down the lipids are found in the blood.

== Genetics ==
Mucopolysaccharidosis has an autosomal recessive pattern of inheritance.

It is estimated that 1 in 25,000 babies born in the United States will have some form of the mucopolysaccharidoses. Approximately 1 in 100,000 newborns will experience severe mucopolysaccharidosis type I, while approximately 1 in 500,000 newborns will experience attenuated mucopolysaccharidosis type I. Most mucopolysaccharidoses are autosomal recessive disorders, meaning that only individuals inheriting the defective gene from both parents are affected. (The exception is MPS II, or Hunter syndrome, in which the mother alone passes along the defective gene to a son.) When both people in a couple have the defective gene, each pregnancy carries with it a one in four chance that the child will be affected. The parents and siblings of an affected child may have no sign of the disorder. Unaffected siblings and select relatives of a child with one of the mucopolysaccharidoses may carry the recessive gene and could pass it to their own children.

== Diagnosis ==
Diagnosis often can be made through clinical examination and urine tests (excess mucopolysaccharides are excreted in the urine). Enzyme assays (testing a variety of cells or body fluids in culture for enzyme deficiency) are also used to provide definitive diagnosis of one of the mucopolysaccharidoses. Prenatal diagnosis using amniocentesis and chorionic villus sampling can verify if a fetus either carries a copy of the defective gene or is affected with the disorder. Genetic counseling can help parents who have a family history of the mucopolysaccharidoses determine if they are carrying the mutated gene that causes the disorders.

=== Types ===
Seven distinct clinical types and numerous subtypes of the mucopolysaccharidoses have been identified. Although each mucopolysaccharidosis (MPS) differs clinically, most patients generally experience a period of normal development followed by a decline in physical and/or mental function. (Note: MPS-V and MPS-VIII are no longer in use as designations for any disease.)

=== Overview table ===
Main mucopolysaccharidoses
Type	Common name Other names	OMIM	Gene	Locus	Deficient enzyme	Accumulated products	Symptoms	Incidence
MPS IH	Hurler syndrome	607014	IDUA	4p16.3	α-L-iduronidase	Heparan sulfate Dermatan sulfate	Intellectual disability, micrognathia, coarse facial features, macroglossia, retinal degeneration, corneal clouding, cardiomyopathy, hepatosplenomegaly	1:100,000
MPS IH/S	Hurler–Scheie syndrome	607015	IDUA	4p16.3	α-L-iduronidase	Heparan sulfate Dermatan sulfate	Intellectual disability, micrognathia, coarse facial features, macroglossia, retinal degeneration, corneal clouding, cardiomyopathy, hepatosplenomegaly	1:100,000
MPS IS	Scheie syndrome Formerly: Mucopolysaccharidosis type V	607016	IDUA	4p16.3	α-L-iduronidase	Heparan sulfate Dermatan sulfate	Intellectual disability, micrognathia, coarse facial features, macroglossia, retinal degeneration, corneal clouding, cardiomyopathy, hepatosplenomegaly	1:100,000
MPS II	Hunter syndrome	309900	IDS	Xq28	Iduronate sulfatase	Heparan sulfate Dermatan sulfate	Intellectual disability (similar, but milder, symptoms to MPS I). This type exceptionally has X-linked recessive inheritance	1:100,000-1:150,000 males
MPS IIIA	Sanfilippo syndrome A Sulfamidase deficiency	252900	SGSH	17q25.3	Heparan sulfamidase	Heparan sulfate	Developmental delay, severe hyperactivity, spasticity, motor dysfunction, death by the second decade	1:280,000 – 1:50,000
MPS IIIB	Sanfilippo syndrome B NAGLU deficiency	252920	NAGLU	17q21.2	N-acetylglucosaminidase	Heparan sulfate	Developmental delay, severe hyperactivity, spasticity, motor dysfunction, death by the second decade	1:280,000 – 1:50,000
MPS IIIC	Sanfilippo syndrome C	252930	HGSNAT	8p11.21	Heparan-α-glucosaminide N-acetyltransferase	Heparan sulfate	Developmental delay, severe hyperactivity, spasticity, motor dysfunction, death by the second decade	1:280,000 – 1:50,000
MPS IIID	Sanfilippo syndrome D	252940	GNS	12q14.3	N-acetylglucosamine 6-sulfatase	Heparan sulfate	Developmental delay, severe hyperactivity, spasticity, motor dysfunction, death by the second decade	1:280,000 – 1:50,000
MPS IVA	Morquio syndrome A	253000	GALNS	16q24.3	Galactose-6-sulfate sulfatase	Keratan sulfate Chondroitin 6-sulfate	Severe skeletal dysplasia, short stature, motor dysfunction	1 in 75,000
MPS IVB	Morquio syndrome B	253010	GLB1	3p22.3	β-galactosidase	Keratan sulfate	Severe skeletal dysplasia, short stature, motor dysfunction	1 in 75,000
MPS V	See MPS IS (Scheie syndrome) above							
MPS VI	Maroteaux–Lamy syndrome ARSB deficiency	253200	ARSB	5q14.1	N-acetylgalactosamine-4-sulfatase	Dermatan sulfate	Severe skeletal dysplasia, short stature, motor dysfunction, kyphosis, heart defects	
MPS VII	Sly syndrome GUSB deficiency	253220	GUSB	7q11.21	β-glucuronidase	Heparan sulfate Dermatan sulfate Chondroitin 4,6-sulfate	Hepatomegaly, skeletal dysplasia, short stature, corneal clouding, developmental delay	<1:250,000
MPS IX	Natowicz syndrome Hyaluronidase deficiency	601492	HYAL1	3p21.31	Hyaluronidase	Hyaluronic acid	Nodular soft-tissue masses around joints, episodes of painful swelling of the masses, short-term pain, mild facial changes, short stature, normal joint movement, normal intelligence	

=== MPS I ===
MPS I is divided into three subtypes based on severity of symptoms. All three types result from an absence of, or insufficient levels of, the enzyme alpha-L-iduronidase. Children born to an MPS I parent carry the defective gene.

- MPS I H (also called Hurler syndrome or α-L-iduronidase deficiency), is the most severe of the MPS I subtypes. Developmental delay is evident by the end of the first year, and patients usually stop developing between ages 2 and 4. This is followed by progressive mental decline and loss of physical skills. Language may be limited due to hearing loss and an enlarged tongue. In time, the clear layers of the cornea become clouded and retinas may begin to degenerate. Carpal tunnel syndrome (or similar compression of nerves elsewhere in the body) and restricted joint movement are common.

Affected children may be quite large at birth and appear normal but may have inguinal (in the groin) or umbilical (where the umbilical cord passes through the abdomen) hernias. Growth in height may be faster than normal but begins to slow before the end of the first year and often ends around age 3. Many children develop a short body trunk and a maximum stature of less than 4 feet. Distinct facial features (including flat face, depressed nasal bridge, and bulging forehead) become more evident in the second year. By age 2, the ribs have widened and are oar-shaped. The liver, spleen, and heart are often enlarged. Children may experience noisy breathing and recurring upper respiratory tract and ear infections. Feeding may be difficult for some children, and many experience periodic bowel problems. Children with Hurler syndrome often die before age 10 from obstructive airway disease, respiratory infections, and cardiac complications.

- MPS I S, Scheie syndrome, is the mildest form of MPS I. Symptoms generally begin to appear after age 5, with diagnosis most commonly made after age 10. Children with Scheie syndrome have normal intelligence or may have mild learning disabilities; some may have psychiatric problems. Glaucoma, retinal degeneration, and clouded corneas may significantly impair vision. Other problems include carpal tunnel syndrome or other nerve compression, stiff joints, claw hands and deformed feet, a short neck, and aortic valve disease. Some affected individuals also have obstructive airway disease and sleep apnea. Persons with Scheie syndrome can live into adulthood.
- MPS I H-S, Hurler–Scheie syndrome, is less severe than Hurler syndrome alone. Symptoms generally begin between ages 3 and 8. Children may have moderate intellectual disability and learning difficulties. Skeletal and systemic irregularities include short stature, marked smallness in the jaws, progressive joint stiffness, compressed spinal cord, clouded corneas, hearing loss, heart disease, coarse facial features, and umbilical hernia. Respiratory problems, sleep apnea, and heart disease may develop in adolescence. Some persons with MPS I H-S need continuous positive airway pressure during sleep to ease breathing. Life expectancy is generally into the late teens or early twenties.

Although no studies have been done to determine the frequency of MPS I in the United States, studies in British Columbia estimate that 1 in 100,000 babies born has Hurler syndrome. The estimate for Scheie syndrome is one in 500,000 births and for Hurler-Scheie syndrome it is one in 115,000 births.

=== MPS II ===
MPS II, Hunter syndrome or iduronate sulfatase deficiency, is caused by lack of the enzyme iduronate sulfatase. Hunter syndrome has two clinical subtypes and (since it shows X-linked recessive inheritance) is the only one of the mucopolysaccharidoses in which the mother alone can pass the defective gene to a son. The incidence of Hunter syndrome is estimated to be 1 in 100,000 to 150,000 male births.

=== MPS III ===
MPS III, Sanfilippo syndrome, is marked by severe neurological symptoms. These include progressive dementia, aggressive behavior, hyperactivity, seizures, some deafness and loss of vision, and an inability to sleep for more than a few hours at a time. This disorder tends to have three main stages. During the first stage, early mental and motor skill development may be somewhat delayed. Affected children show a marked decline in learning between ages 2 and 6, followed by eventual loss of language skills and loss of some or all hearing. Some children may never learn to speak. In the syndrome's second stage, aggressive behavior, hyperactivity, profound dementia, and irregular sleep may make children difficult to manage, particularly those who retain normal physical strength. In the syndrome's last stage, children become increasingly unsteady on their feet and most are unable to walk by age 10.

Thickened skin and mild changes in facial features, bone, and skeletal structures become noticeable with age. Growth in height usually stops by age 10. Other problems may include narrowing of the airway passage in the throat and enlargement of the tonsils and adenoids, making it difficult to eat or swallow. Recurring respiratory infections are common.

There are four distinct types of Sanfilippo syndrome, each caused by alteration of a different enzyme needed to completely break down the heparan sulfate sugar chain. Little clinical difference exists between these four types but symptoms appear most severe and seem to progress more quickly in children with type A. The average duration of Sanfilippo syndrome is 8 to 10 years following onset of symptoms. Most persons with MPS III live into their teenage years, and some live longer.

- Sanfilippo A is the most severe of the MPS III disorders and is caused by the missing or altered enzyme heparan N-sulfatase. Children with Sanfilippo A have the shortest survival rate among those with the MPS III disorders.
- Sanfilippo B is caused by the missing or deficient enzyme alpha-N-acetylglucosaminidase.
- Sanfilippo C results from the missing or altered enzyme acetyl-CoAlpha-glucosaminide acetyltransferase.
- Sanfilippo D is caused by the missing or deficient enzyme N-acetylglucosamine 6-sulfatase.

The incidence of Sanfilippo syndrome (for all four types combined) is about one in 70,000 births.

=== MPS IV ===
MPS IV, Morquio syndrome, is estimated to occur in 1 in 700,000 births. Its two subtypes result from the missing or deficient enzymes N-acetylgalactosamine-6-sulfatase (GALNS) (Type A) or beta-galactosidase (Type B) needed to break down the keratan sulfate sugar chain. Clinical features are similar in both types but appear milder in Morquio Type B. Onset is between ages 1 and 3. Neurological complications include spinal nerve and nerve root compression resulting from extreme, progressive skeletal changes, particularly in the ribs and chest; conductive and/or neurosensitive loss of hearing and clouded corneas. Intelligence is normal unless hydrocephalus develops and is not treated.

Physical growth slows generally around the age of 18 months, and stops completely by the age of 8. Skeletal abnormalities include a bell-shaped chest, a flattening or curvature of the spine, shortened long bones, and dysplasia of the hips, knees, ankles, and wrists. The bones that stabilize the connection between the head and neck can be malformed (odontoid hypoplasia); in these cases, a surgical procedure called spinal cervical bone fusion can be lifesaving. Restricted breathing, joint stiffness, and heart disease are also common. Children with the more severe form of Morquio syndrome may not live beyond their twenties or thirties.

=== MPS VI ===
Children with MPS VI, Maroteaux–Lamy syndrome, usually have normal intellectual development but share many of the physical symptoms found in Hurler syndrome. Caused by the deficient enzyme N-acetylgalactosamine 4-sulfatase, Maroteaux-Lamy syndrome has a variable spectrum of severe symptoms. Neurological complications include clouded corneas, deafness, thickening of the dura (the membrane that surrounds and protects the brain and spinal cord), and pain caused by compressed or traumatized nerves and nerve roots.

Growth is normal at first but stops suddenly around age 8. By age 10 children have developed a shortened trunk, crouched stance, and restricted joint movement. In more severe cases, children also develop a protruding abdomen and forward-curving spine. Skeletal changes (particularly in the pelvic region) are progressive and limit movement. Many children also have umbilical or inguinal hernias. Nearly all children have some form of heart disease.

An enzyme replacement therapy was tested on patients with MPS VI and was successful in that it improved growth and joint movement. An experiment was then carried out to see whether an injection of the missing enzyme into the hips would help the range of motion and pain.

=== MPS VII ===
MPS VII, Sly syndrome, one of the least common forms of the mucopolysaccharidoses, is estimated to occur in fewer than one in 250,000 births. The disorder is caused by deficiency of the enzyme beta-glucuronidase. In its rarest form, Sly syndrome causes children to be born with hydrops fetalis, in which extreme amounts of fluid are retained in the body. Survival is usually a few months or less. Most children with Sly syndrome are less severely affected. Neurological symptoms may include mild to moderate intellectual disability by age 3, communicating hydrocephalus, nerve entrapment, corneal clouding, and some loss of peripheral and night vision. Other symptoms include short stature, some skeletal irregularities, joint stiffness and restricted movement, and umbilical and/or inguinal hernias. Some patients may have repeated bouts of pneumonia during their first years of life. Most children with Sly syndrome live into the teenage or young adult years.

=== MPS IX ===
As of 2011, only one case of MPS IX was known, but another three were reported in the same year. The disorder results from hyaluronidase deficiency. Symptoms included nodular soft-tissue masses located around joints, with episodes of painful swelling of the masses and pain that ended spontaneously within 3 days. Pelvic radiography showed multiple soft-tissue masses and some bone erosion. Other traits included mild facial changes, acquired short stature as seen in other MPS disorders, and normal joint movement and intelligence.

== Treatment ==
Currently there is no cure for these disorders. Medical care is directed at treating systemic conditions and improving the person's quality of life. Physical therapy and daily exercise may delay joint problems and improve the ability to move.

Changes to the diet will not prevent disease progression, but limiting milk, sugar, and dairy products has helped some individuals experiencing excessive mucus.

Surgery to remove tonsils and adenoids may improve breathing among affected individuals with obstructive airway disorders and sleep apnea. Sleep studies can assess airway status and the possible need for nighttime oxygen. Some patients may require surgical insertion of an endotrachial tube to aid breathing. Surgery can also correct hernias, help drain excessive cerebrospinal fluid from the brain, and free nerves and nerve roots compressed by skeletal and other abnormalities. Corneal transplants may improve vision among patients with significant corneal clouding.

Enzyme replacement therapy has proven useful in reducing non-neurological symptoms and pain. Currently BioMarin Pharmaceutical produces enzyme replacement therapies for MPS type I and VI. Aldurazyme is an enzymatic replacement therapy for alpha-L-iduronidase produced by BioMarin for use in Type I MPS. In May 2005, galsulfase (under the name Naglazyme), a recombinant enzyme replacement therapy also produced by Biomarin was approved for MPS VI (Marateaux-Lamy syndrome). In July 2006, the United States Food and Drug Administration approved a synthetic version of I2S produced by Shire Pharmaceuticals Group, called Elaprase, as a treatment for MPS type II (Hunter syndrome). Vestronidase alfa (Mepsevii) is a recombinant human lysosomal beta glucuronidase for MPS VII (Sly syndrome) approved in the United States in November 2017 (Ultragenyx).

Bone marrow transplantation (BMT) and umbilical cord blood transplantation (UCBT) have had limited success in treating the mucopolysaccharidoses. Abnormal physical characteristics, except for those affecting the skeleton and eyes, may be improved, but neurologic outcomes have varied. BMT and UCBT are high-risk procedures and are usually performed only after family members receive extensive evaluation and counseling.

== See also ==
- Alder–Reilly anomaly — a morphologic abnormality of white blood cells associated with mucopolysaccharidosis
- Lysosomal storage disease
