= Iduronate-2-sulfatase =

Enzyme found in humans

IDS
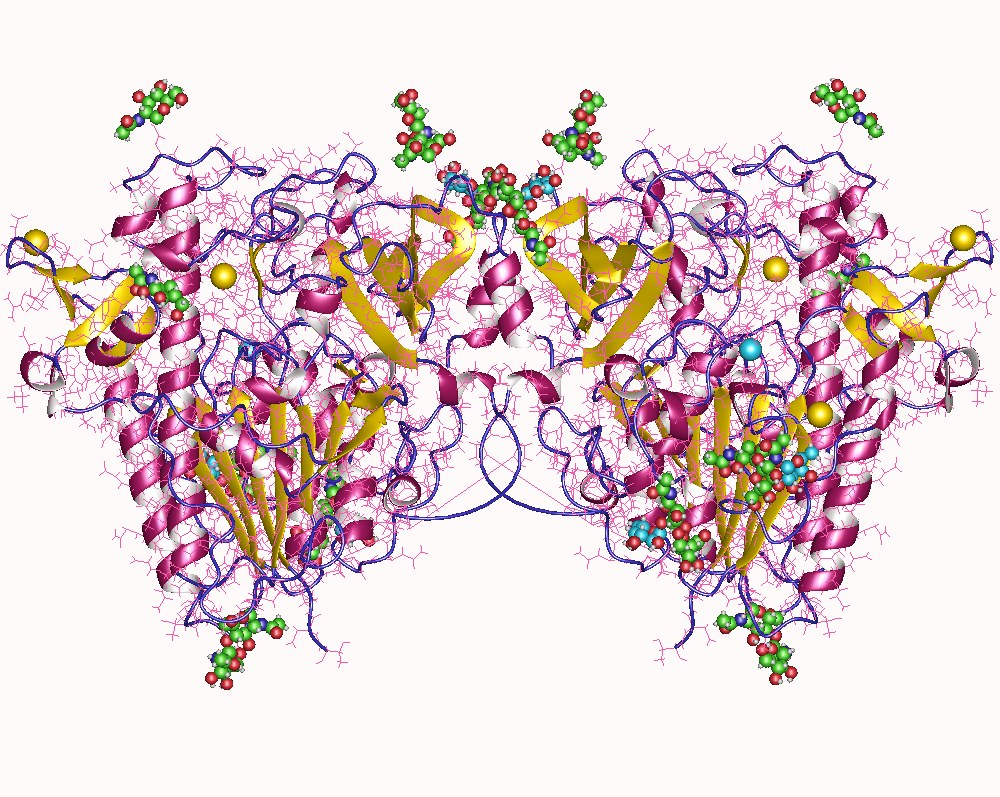

Identifiers
- Aliases: IDS, MPS2, Siduronate 2-sulfatase, ID2S
- External IDs: OMIM: 300823; MGI: 96417; GeneCards: IDS
Enzyme activity
| EC # | BRENDA | ExPASy | KEGG | MetaCyc |
|---|---|---|---|---|
| 3.1.6.13 | ↗ | ↗ | ↗ | ↗ |

Gene location (Human)
| Chr. | X chromosome (human) |
| Band | Xq28 | Start | 149,476,988 bp |
| Band | Xq28 | End | 149,521,096 bp |

Gene location (Mouse)
| Chr. | X chromosome (mouse) |
| Band | X A7.2|X 36.01 cM | Start | 69,386,675 bp |
| Band | X A7.2|X 36.01 cM | End | 69,408,690 bp |
RNA expression pattern
| Bgee | Human / Mouse (ortholog); Top expressed in: right frontal lobe; Descending thoracic aorta; right coronary artery; Brodmann area 9; nucleus accumbens; ascending aorta; cingulate gyrus; islet of Langerhans; anterior cingulate cortex; amygdala / Top expressed in: subiculum; habenula; anterior amygdaloid area; ventral tegmental area; paraventricular nucleus of hypothalamus; ventromedial nucleus; globus pallidus; dorsomedial hypothalamic nucleus; nucleus accumbens; Epithelium of choroid plexus; More reference expression data |
| BioGPS | n/a |
Gene ontology
| Molecular function | sulfuric ester hydrolase activity; iduronate-2-sulfatase activity; catalytic activity; hydrolase activity; metal ion binding |
| Cellular component | lysosome; lysosomal lumen |
| Biological process | chondroitin sulfate catabolic process; metabolism; glycosaminoglycan catabolic process |
Sources:Amigo / QuickGO
Orthologs
| Databases | NCBI: entry; OMA: entry |
| Species | Human | Mouse |
| Entrez | 3423 | 15931 |
| Ensembl | ENSG00000010404 | ENSMUSG00000035847 |
| UniProt | P22304 | Q08890 |
| RefSeq (mRNA) | NM_000202; NM_001166550; NM_006123 | NM_001038990; NM_001038991; NM_010498 |
| RefSeq (protein) | NP_000193; NP_001160022; NP_006114 | NP_034628; NP_001388855; NP_001388856; NP_001388858; NP_001388859 NP_001388860; NP_001388861; NP_001388862; NP_001388863; NP_001388864; NP_001388865; NP_001388866 |
| Location (UCSC) | Chr X: 149.48 – 149.52 Mb | Chr X: 69.39 – 69.41 Mb |
| PubMed search |
- Wikidata
| View/Edit Human | View/Edit Mouse |

Iduronate 2-sulfatase (EC 3.1.6.13; systematic name L-iduronate-2-sulfate 2-sulfohydrolase) is an enzyme that in humans is encoded by the IDS gene. This sulfatase enzyme is associated with Hunter syndrome. It catalyses hydrolysis of the 2-sulfate groups of the L-iduronate 2-sulfate units of dermatan sulfate, heparan sulfate and heparin.

== Function ==
Iduronate 2-sulfatase is required for the lysosomal degradation of heparan sulfate and dermatan sulfate. Mutations in this X-chromosome gene that result in enzymatic deficiency lead to the sex-linked mucopolysaccharidosis type II, also known as Hunter syndrome. At least 174 disease-causing mutations in this gene have been discovered. Iduronate-2-sulfatase has a strong sequence homology with human arylsulfatases A, B, and C, and human glucosamine-6-sulfatase. A splice variant of this gene has been described.

== See also ==
- Idursulfase
