= ESM1 =

Protein-coding gene in the species Homo sapiens

Identifiers
- Aliases: ESM1, endocan, endothelial cell specific molecule 1
- External IDs: OMIM: 601521; MGI: 1918940; HomoloGene: 5107; GeneCards: ESM1; OMA:ESM1 - orthologs

Gene location (Human)
Chr.	Chromosome 5 (human)
Band	5q11.2	Start	54,977,867 bp
Band	5q11.2	End	55,022,671 bp

Gene location (Mouse)
Chr.	Chromosome 13 (mouse)
Band	13|13 D2.2	Start	113,346,193 bp
Band	13|13 D2.2	End	113,354,632 bp
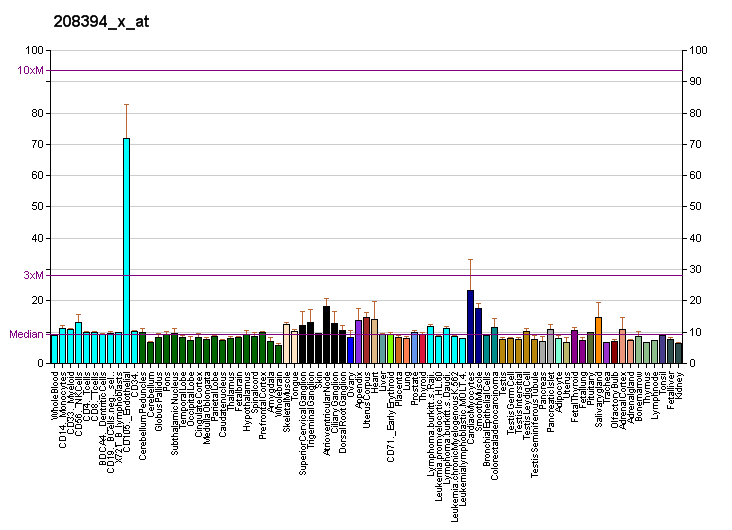
RNA expression pattern
Bgee	Human / Mouse (ortholog); Top expressed in: islet of Langerhans; right lung; testicle; trabecular bone; upper lobe of left lung; human kidney; lower lobe of lung; renal cortex; visceral pleura; tibia / Top expressed in: pineal gland; islet of Langerhans; right kidney; stroma of bone marrow; human kidney; adrenal gland; pituitary gland; proximal tubule; extraocular muscle; renal corpuscle; More reference expression data
BioGPS	More reference expression data
Gene ontology
Molecular function	integrin binding; insulin-like growth factor binding; hepatocyte growth factor receptor binding
Cellular component	extracellular region
Biological process	sprouting angiogenesis; regulation of cell growth; angiogenesis; positive regulation of cell population proliferation; positive regulation of hepatocyte growth factor receptor signaling pathway
Sources:Amigo / QuickGO
Orthologs
Species	Human	Mouse
Entrez	11082	71690
Ensembl	ENSG00000164283	ENSMUSG00000042379
UniProt	Q9NQ30	Q9QYY7
RefSeq (mRNA)	NM_007036; NM_001135604	NM_023612
RefSeq (protein)	NP_001129076; NP_008967	NP_076101
Location (UCSC)	Chr 5: 54.98 – 55.02 Mb	Chr 13: 113.35 – 113.35 Mb
PubMed search
- Wikidata
View/Edit Human	View/Edit Mouse

Endothelial cell-specific molecule 1 is a protein that in humans is encoded by the ESM1 gene.

This gene encodes a secreted protein which is mainly expressed in the endothelial cells in human lung and kidney tissues. The expression of this gene is regulated by cytokines, suggesting that it may play a role in endothelium-dependent pathological disorders. The transcript contains multiple polyadenylation and mRNA instability signals.

The ESM-1 gene product is also called endocan since 2001, when it was characterized as a dermatan sulfate proteoglycan by Bechard et al. Recently, endocan / ESM-1 has been described as a specific biomarker of tip cells during neoangiogenesis by independent teams. Endocan expression has been shown to be increase in presence of pro-angiogenic growth factors such as vascular endothelial growth factor (VEGF) or fibroblast growth factor 2 (FGF-2). In hypervascularized cancers, overexpression of endocan has been detected by immunohistochemistry using monoclonal antibodies against endocan / ESM-1.
