= Chondroitinsulfatase =

Chondroitinsulfatase may refer to:

- N-acetylgalactosamine-4-sulfatase, it is an enzyme
- N-acetylglucosamine-6-sulfatase, it is an enzyme
