= Saving Eliza =

Saving Eliza is the name for both a campaign, and associated three minute video, focused on saving the life of Eliza O'Neill. Eliza, then a 3-year-old living in Columbia, South Carolina, was diagnosed in 2013 with Sanfillipo syndrome – a terminal, rapidly degenerative disease in children. The O'Neill family is working to raise the money needed to fund a clinical trial which could save the lives of Eliza and other children with the disease. Their efforts are part of a trend, by concerned private citizens, to raise money for research and drug trials regarding rare diseases, which might otherwise be under-addressed by pharmaceutical companies. The O'Neills had found that researchers at Nationwide Children's Hospital, in Columbus, Ohio, had found a gene therapy that worked on mice, but they would need an additional $2.5 million to start clinical trials humans.

The O'Neills established the non-profit Cure Sanfilippo Foundation to advocate for and fund research towards the cure for children. The campaign was launched in October 2013. After raising only $250,000 in the first half year, they expanded their efforts with the addition of the video in July 2014.

The original Saving Eliza campaign was channeled through the GoFundMe web platform in October 2013. By 2016, after the video went viral, the GoFundMe campaign surpassed its original goal of $2 million – a new record, at that time, as the most money ever raised for a single GoFundMe campaign.
