= Hunter syndrome =

X-linked recessive genetic condition

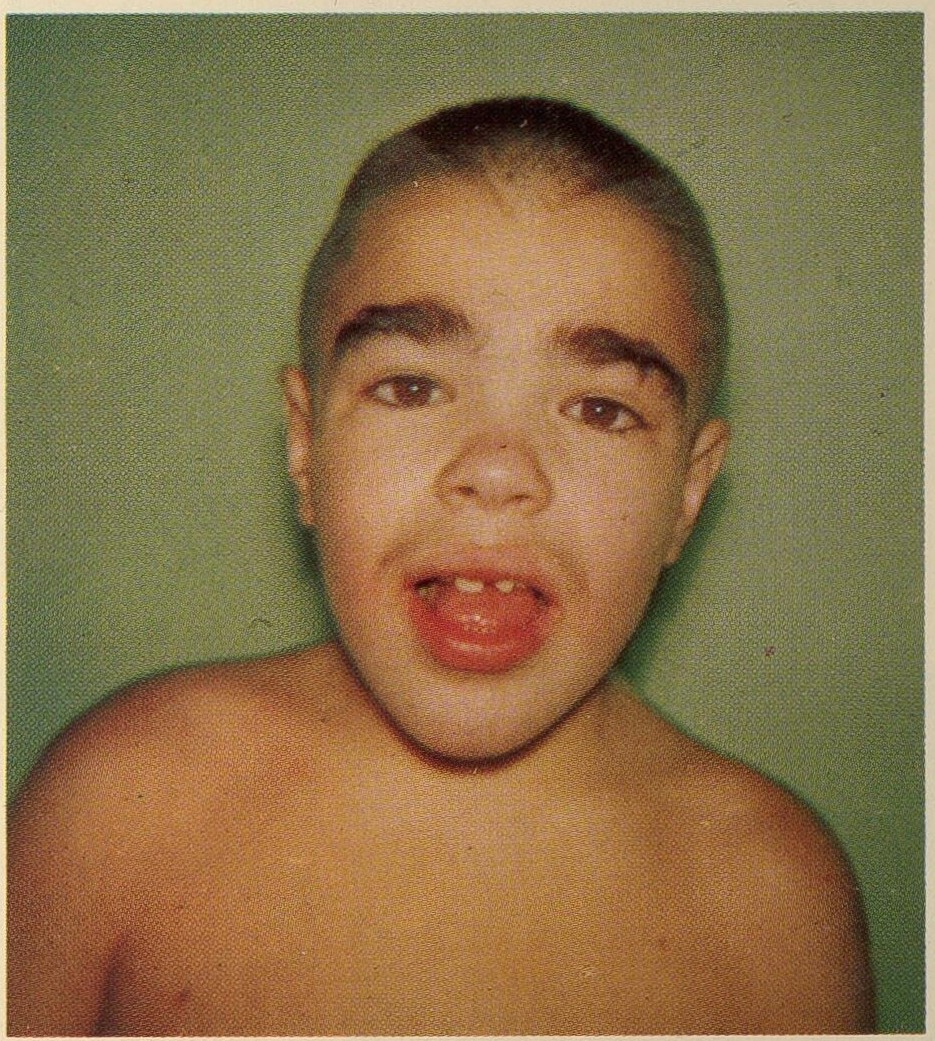
- Patient with Hunter syndrome displaying characteristic facial features
- Specialty: Endocrinology
- Symptoms: Skeletal abnormalities, hearing loss, retinal degeneration, enlarged liver and spleen
- Complications: Upper airway disease; cardiovascular failure
- Causes: Defiency of the enzyme iduronate-2-sulfatase
- Differential diagnosis: Mucopolysaccharidosis type I; other mucopolysaccharidoses
- Prognosis: In severe cases, death usually occurs by age 15. In attenuated cases, patients may survive into their 50s
- Frequency: 1 in 100,000 to 150,000 male births

Hunter syndrome, or mucopolysaccharidosis type II (MPS II), is a rare inherited lysosomal storage disease in which large sugar molecules called glycosaminoglycans (or GAGs or mucopolysaccharides) build up in body tissues. Hunter syndrome is caused by a deficiency of the lysosomal enzyme iduronate-2-sulfatase (I2S). The lack of this enzyme causes heparan sulfate and dermatan sulfate to accumulate in all body tissues. Hunter syndrome is the only MPS syndrome to exhibit X-linked recessive inheritance.

The symptoms of Hunter syndrome are comparable to those of MPS I. It causes abnormalities in many organs, including the skeleton, heart, and respiratory system. In severe cases, this leads to death during the teenage years. Unlike MPS I, corneal clouding is not associated with this disease.

== Signs and symptoms ==
Hunter syndrome may present with a wide variety of phenotypes. It has traditionally been categorized as either "mild" or "severe" depending on the presence of central nervous system symptoms, but this is an oversimplification. Patients with "attenuated" or "mild" forms of the disease may still have significant health issues. For severely affected patients, the clinical course is relatively predictable; patients will normally die at an early age. For those with milder forms of the disease, a wider variety of outcomes exist. Many live into their 20s and 30s, but some may have near-normal life expectancies. Cardiac and respiratory abnormalities are the usual cause of death for patients with milder forms of the disease.

The symptoms of Hunter syndrome (MPS II) are generally not apparent at birth. Often, the first symptoms may include abdominal hernias, ear infections, runny noses, and colds. As the buildup of GAGs continues throughout the cells of the body, signs of MPS II become more visible. The physical appearance of many children with the syndrome includes a distinctive coarseness in their facial features, including a prominent forehead, a nose with a flattened bridge, and an enlarged tongue. They may also have a large head, as well as an enlarged abdomen. For severe cases of MPS II, a diagnosis is often made between the ages of 18 and 36 months. In milder cases, patients present similarly to children with Hurler–Scheie syndrome, and a diagnosis is usually made between the ages of 4 and 8 years.

The continued storage of GAGs leads to abnormalities in multiple organ systems. After 18 months, children with severe MPS II may experience developmental decline and progressive loss of skills. The thickening of the heart valves and walls of the heart can result in a progressive decline in cardiac function. The walls of the airway may become thickened, as well, leading to obstructive airway disease. As the liver and spleen grow larger with time, the abdomen may become distended, making hernias more noticeable. All major joints may be affected by MPS II, leading to joint stiffness and limited motion. Progressive involvement of the finger and thumb joints results in a decreased ability to pick up small objects. The effects on other joints, such as hips and knees, can make walking normally increasingly difficult. If carpal tunnel syndrome develops, a further decrease in hand function can occur. The bones themselves may be affected, resulting in short stature. In addition, pebbly, ivory-colored skin lesions may be found on the upper arms, legs, and upper back of some people with it. These skin lesions are considered pathognomonic for the disease. Finally, the storage of GAGs in the brain can lead to delayed development with subsequent intellectual disability and progressive loss of function.

The age at onset of symptoms and the presence or absence of behavioral disturbances are predictive factors of ultimate disease severity in very young patients. Behavioral disturbances can often mimic combinations of symptoms of attention deficit hyperactivity disorder, autism, obsessive compulsive disorder, and/or sensory processing disorder, although the existence and level of symptoms differ in each affected child. They often also include a lack of an appropriate sense of danger and aggression. The behavioral symptoms of MPS II generally precede neurodegeneration and often increase in severity until the mental handicaps become more pronounced. By the time of death, most children with severe MPS II have severe mental disabilities and are completely dependent on their caretakers.

== Genetics ==
MPS II has an X-linked recessive pattern of inheritance.

Since Hunter syndrome is an X-linked recessive disorder, it preferentially affects male patients. The IDS gene is located on the X chromosome. The IDS gene encodes for an enzyme called iduronate-2-sulfatase (I2S). A lack of this enzyme leads to a buildup of GAGs, which cause the symptoms of MPS II.

If a female inherits one copy of the mutant allele for MPS II, she will usually have a normal copy of the IDS gene which can compensate for the mutant allele. This is known as being a genetic carrier. A male who inherits a defective X chromosome, though, usually does not have another X chromosome to compensate for the mutant gene. Thus, a female would need to inherit two mutant genes to develop MPS II, while a male patient only needs to inherit one mutant gene. A female carrier can be affected due to X-inactivation, which is a random process.

== Pathophysiology ==
Dermatan sulfate is one of the GAGs that build up in the tissues of people with MPS II.

The human body depends on a vast array of biochemical reactions to support critical functions. One of these functions is the breakdown of large biomolecules. The failure of this process is the underlying problem in Hunter syndrome and related storage disorders.

The biochemistry of Hunter syndrome is related to a problem in a part of the connective tissue known as the extracellular matrix, which is made up of a variety of sugars and proteins. It helps to form the architectural framework of the body. The matrix surrounds the cells of the body in an organized meshwork and functions as the glue that holds the cells of the body together. One of the parts of the extracellular matrix is a molecule called a proteoglycan. Like many components of the body, proteoglycans need to be broken down and replaced. When the body breaks down proteoglycans, one of the resulting products is mucopolysaccharides (GAGs).

In MPS II, the problem concerns the breakdown of two GAGs: dermatan sulfate and heparan sulfate. The first step in the breakdown of dermatan sulfate and heparan sulfate requires the lysosomal enzyme iduronate-2-sulfatase, or I2S. In people with MPS II, this enzyme is either partially or completely inactive. As a result, GAGs build up in cells throughout the body, particularly in tissues that contain large amounts of dermatan sulfate and heparan sulfate. The rate of GAGs buildup is not the same for all people with MPS II, resulting in a wide spectrum of medical problems.

== Diagnosis ==
The first laboratory screening test for an MPS disorder is a urine test for GAGs. Abnormal values indicate that an MPS disorder is likely. The urine test can occasionally be normal even if the child has an MPS disorder. A definitive diagnosis of MPS II is made by measuring I2S activity in serum, white blood cells, or fibroblasts from skin biopsy. In some people with MPS II, analysis of the I2S gene can determine clinical severity.

Prenatal diagnosis is routinely available by measuring I2S enzymatic activity in amniotic fluid or in chorionic villus tissue. If a specific mutation is known to run in the family, prenatal molecular genetic testing can be performed. DNA sequencing can reveal if someone is a carrier for the disease.

== Treatment ==
Because of the wide variety of phenotypes, the treatment for this disorder is specifically determined for each patient. Until recently, no effective therapy for MPS II was available, so palliative care was used. Recent advances, though, have led to medications that can improve survival and well-being in people with MPS II.

=== Enzyme replacement therapy ===
Idursulfase, a purified form of the missing lysosomal enzyme, underwent a clinical trial in 2006 and was subsequently approved by the United States Food and Drug Administration as an enzyme replacement treatment for MPS II. Idursulfase beta, another enzyme replacement treatment, was approved in Korea by the Ministry of Food and Drug Safety.

Tividenofusp alfa (Avlayah), an enzyme fusion protein, was approved for medical use in the United States in March 2026. The approval was based on a phase 1/2 trial with 47 pediatric participants.

=== Bone marrow and stem cell transplantation ===
Bone marrow transplantation and hematopoietic stem cell transplantation (HSCT) have been used as treatments in some studies. While transplantation has provided benefits for many organ systems, it has not been shown to improve the neurological symptoms of the disease. Although HSCT has shown promise in the treatment of other MPS disorders, its results have been unsatisfactory so far in the treatment of MPS II. ERT has been shown to lead to better outcomes in MPS II patients.

=== Gene editing therapy ===
In February 2019, scientists working with Sangamo Therapeutics, announced the first "in body" human gene editing therapy to permanently alter DNA – in a person with MPS II. Clinical trials by Sangamo involving gene editing using zinc finger nuclease are ongoing as of February 2019.

In November 2025, Manchester Children's Hospital reported that a child with the disease was developing normally a year after starting a special treatment that involved gene editing his stem cells. He was one of five children taking part in the trial, but the progress of the others is not yet known.

== Prognosis ==
Earlier onset of symptoms is linked to a worse prognosis. For children who exhibit symptoms between the ages of 2 and 4, death usually occurs by the age of 15 to 20 years. The cause of death is usually due to neurological complications, obstructive airway disease, and cardiac failure. If patients have minimal neurologic involvement, they may survive into their 50s or beyond.

== Epidemiology ==
An estimated 2,000 people have MPS II worldwide, 500 of whom live in the United States.

A study in the United Kingdom indicated an incidence among males around one in 130,000 male live births.

== History ==
The syndrome is named after physician Charles A. Hunter (1873–1955), who first described it in 1917.

== Research ==
Beginning in 2010, a phase I/II clinical trial evaluated intrathecal injections of a more concentrated dose of idursulfase than the intravenous formulation used in enzyme replacement therapy infusions, in hopes of preventing the cognitive decline associated with the severe form of the condition. Results were reported in October 2013. A phase II/III clinical trial began in 2014. This study did not meet the endpoints to submit for commercial access by 2022. Participants were rolled over into a post trial access study until another treatment has been approved by the US Food and Drug Administration (FDA) and made available for commercial access.

Gene-based treatments for MPS II remain investigational. In 2017, a patient with MPS II became the first person to receive in vivo genome editing, using the experimental therapy SB-913. Enrollment in the SB-913 study was later stopped after no clinical benefit was observed. A separate gene therapy, RGX-121, advanced to late-stage clinical testing for neuronopathic MPS II, but the FDA declined to approve it in February 2026 because of concerns about the trial design and evidence of efficacy; the FDA later stated that existing data could be considered under accelerated approval and that no additional studies were required. In August 2026, the FDA paused further use of RGX-121 in clinical trials after spinal imaging abnormalities were identified in 5 treated participants.

== Society ==
On 24 July 2004, Andrew Wragg, 38, of Worthing, West Sussex, England, suffocated his 10-year-old son Jacob with a pillow, because of the boy's disabilities related to MPS II. A military security specialist, Wragg also claimed that he was under stress after returning from the Iraq War. He denied murdering Jacob but pleaded guilty to manslaughter by reason of diminished capacity. Mrs. Justice Anne Rafferty called the case "exceptional", gave Wragg a two-year prison sentence for manslaughter, then suspended his sentence for two years. Rafferty said "nothing [was] to be gained" from sending Wragg to prison for the crime.

== See also ==
- Hurler syndrome (MPS I)
- Sanfilippo syndrome (MPS III)
- Morquio syndrome (MPS IV)
- Prenatal testing
- Genetic counseling
