= SGSH =

Protein-coding gene in the species Homo sapiens

Available structures
PDB	Human UniProt search: PDBe RCSB
PDB	List of PDB id codes 4MHX, 4MIV

Identifiers
- Aliases: SGSH, HSS, MPS3A, SFMD, N-sulfoglucosamine sulfohydrolase
- External IDs: OMIM: 605270; MGI: 1350341; HomoloGene: 167; GeneCards: SGSH; OMA:SGSH - orthologs

Gene location (Human)
Chr.	Chromosome 17 (human)
Band	17q25.3	Start	80,206,716 bp
Band	17q25.3	End	80,220,923 bp

Gene location (Mouse)
Chr.	Chromosome 11 (mouse)
Band	11 E2|11 83.36 cM	Start	119,234,251 bp
Band	11 E2|11 83.36 cM	End	119,246,362 bp
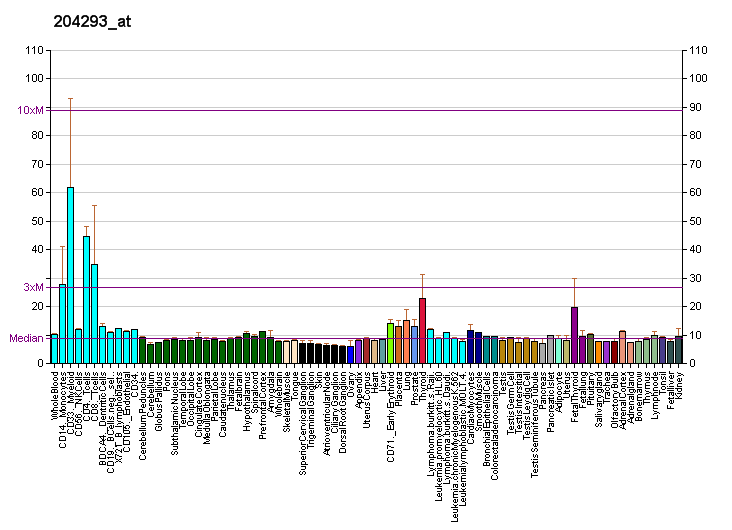

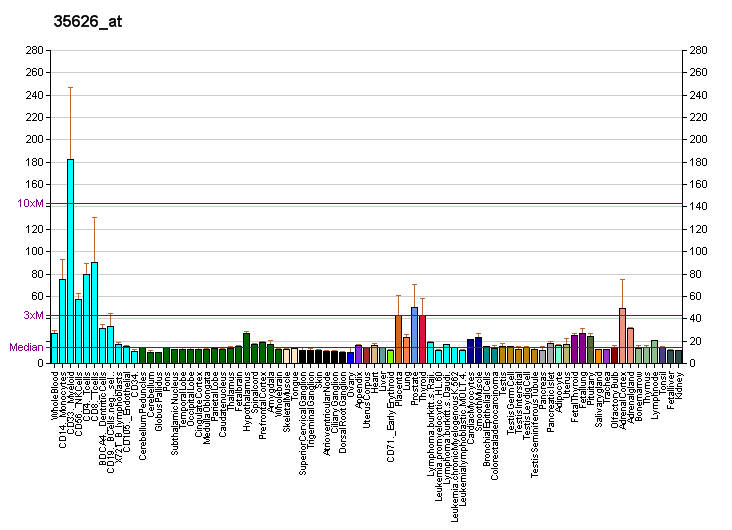
RNA expression pattern
Bgee	Human / Mouse (ortholog); Top expressed in: left adrenal gland; left adrenal cortex; right adrenal cortex; granulocyte; spleen; stromal cell of endometrium; right uterine tube; right lobe of thyroid gland; left lobe of thyroid gland; gastric mucosa / Top expressed in: stroma of bone marrow; Paneth cell; granulocyte; iris; tail of embryo; renal corpuscle; spleen; epithelium of lens; vestibular membrane of cochlear duct; calvaria; More reference expression data
BioGPS	More reference expression data
Gene ontology
Molecular function	sulfuric ester hydrolase activity; hydrolase activity; metal ion binding; catalytic activity; N-sulfoglucosamine sulfohydrolase activity
Cellular component	lysosomal lumen; extracellular exosome; lysosome
Biological process	metabolism; glycosaminoglycan catabolic process; heparan sulfate proteoglycan catabolic process
Sources:Amigo / QuickGO
Orthologs
Species	Human	Mouse
Entrez	6448	27029
Ensembl	ENSG00000181523	ENSMUSG00000005043
UniProt	P51688	n/a
RefSeq (mRNA)	NM_000199; NM_001352921; NM_001352922	NM_018822
RefSeq (protein)	NP_000190; NP_001339850; NP_001339851	n/a
Location (UCSC)	Chr 17: 80.21 – 80.22 Mb	Chr 11: 119.23 – 119.25 Mb
PubMed search
- Wikidata
View/Edit Human	View/Edit Mouse

N-sulphoglucosamine sulphohydrolase is an enzyme that in humans is encoded by the SGSH gene.

== Clinical significance ==
A number sign (#) is used with this entry because the phenotype is caused by mutation in the gene encoding N-sulfoglucosamine sulfohydrolase (SGSH; MIM 605270). The Sanfilippo syndrome, or mucopolysaccharidosis III, is a lysosomal storage disease due to impaired degradation of heparan sulfate. MPS III includes 4 types, each due to the deficiency of a different enzyme: heparan N-sulfatase (type A); alpha-N-acetylglucosaminidase (type B; MIM 252920); acetyl CoA:alpha-glucosaminide acetyltransferase (type C; MIM 252930); and N-acetylglucosamine 6-sulfatase (type D; MIM 252940). The Sanfilippo syndrome is characterized by severe central nervous system degeneration, but only mild somatic disease. Onset of clinical features usually occurs between 2 and 6 years; severe neurologic degeneration occurs in most patients between 6 and 10 years of age, and death occurs typically during the second or third decade of life. Type A has been reported to be the most severe, with earlier onset and rapid progression of symptoms and shorter survival.
