= Tividenofusp alfa =

Enzyme replacement therapy medication

Clinical data
- Trade names: Avlayah
- Other names: DNL-310, tividenofusp alfa-eknm
- AHFS/Drugs.com: Monograph
- MedlinePlus: a626055
- License data: US DailyMed: Tividenofusp alfa
- Routes of administration: Intravenous
- ATC code: None

Legal status
- Legal status: US: ℞-only

Identifiers
- CAS Number: 2641020-57-5
- UNII: QLD7UJN8CF
- KEGG: D12806

Chemical and physical data
- Formula: C_{4990}H_{7554}N_{1305}O_{1487}S_{29}
- Molar mass: 110548.71 g·mol^{−1}

Tividenofusp alfa, sold under the brand name Avlayah, is an enzyme replacement therapy used for the treatment of Hunter syndrome. Tividenofusp alfa is a hydrolytic lysosomal glycosaminoglycan-specific enzyme.

The most common side effects include upper respiratory tract infection, ear infection, fever, anemia, cough, vomiting, diarrhea, rash, COVID-19, runny nose, nasal congestion, fall, headache, skin abrasion, and hives.

Tividenofusp alfa was approved for medical use in the United States in March 2026.

== Medical uses ==
Tividenofusp alfa is indicated for the treatment of neurologic manifestations of Hunter syndrome (mucopolysaccharidosis type II) when initiated in presymptomatic or symptomatic children weighing at least 5 kg (11 lb) prior to advanced neurologic impairment.

Hunter syndrome is a rare inherited lysosomal disorder in which sugar molecules called glycosaminoglycans build up within the cells' lysosomes. This substrate accumulation affects physical and mental development by causing abnormalities in the skeleton, heart, respiratory system, brain, and other organs.

== Adverse effects ==
The US prescription label includes a boxed warning for allergic reactions including anaphylaxis.

The most common side effects include upper respiratory tract infection, ear infection, fever, anemia, cough, vomiting, diarrhea, rash, COVID-19, runny nose, nasal congestion, fall, headache, skin abrasion, and hives.

== Society and culture ==
=== Legal status ===
Tividenofusp alfa was approved for medical use in the United States in March 2026. The US Food and Drug Administration (FDA) granted the application for tividenofusp alfa breakthrough therapy, fast track, priority review, and orphan drug designations. The FDA granted accelerated approval for Avlayah to Denali Therapeutics.

=== Names ===
Tividenofusp alfa is the international nonproprietary name.

Tividenofusp alfa is sold under the brand name Avlayah.
