= Idursulfase =

Clinical data
- AHFS/Drugs.com: Monograph
- License data: EU EMA: by INN
- ATC code: A16AB09 (WHO)

Legal status
- Legal status: US: WARNING

Identifiers
- CAS Number: 50936-59-9
- DrugBank: DB01271
- ChemSpider: none
- UNII: 5W8JGG2651
- KEGG: D04499
- ChEMBL: ChEMBL1201826

Idursulfase (brand name Elaprase), manufactured by Takeda, is a drug used to treat Hunter syndrome (also called MPS-II). It is a purified form of iduronate-2-sulfatase, a lysosomal enzyme, and is produced by recombinant DNA technology in a human cell line.

It is one of the most expensive drugs ever produced, costing US$567,412 per patient per year.
