= NAGLU =

Protein-coding gene in the species Homo sapiens

Identifiers
- Aliases: NAGLU, MPS-IIIB, MPS3B, NAG, UFHSD, CMT2V, N-acetyl-alpha-glucosaminidase
- External IDs: OMIM: 609701; MGI: 1351641; GeneCards: NAGLU
Available structures
PDB	Ortholog search: PDBe RCSB
PDB	List of PDB id codes 4XWH
Enzyme activity
EC #	BRENDA	ExPASy	KEGG	MetaCyc
3.2.1.50	↗	↗	↗	↗

Gene location (Human)
Chr.	Chromosome 17 (human)
Band	17q21.2	Start	42,536,241 bp
Band	17q21.2	End	42,544,449 bp

Gene location (Mouse)
Chr.	Chromosome 11 (mouse)
Band	11|11 D	Start	100,960,838 bp
Band	11|11 D	End	100,968,498 bp
RNA expression pattern
Bgee	Human / Mouse (ortholog); Top expressed in: stromal cell of endometrium; body of pancreas; gastric mucosa; right lobe of liver; thoracic aorta; ascending aorta; right lobe of thyroid gland; right adrenal cortex; left adrenal gland; Descending thoracic aorta / Top expressed in: right kidney; spermatocyte; decidua; stroma of bone marrow; proximal tubule; calvaria; gastrula; spermatid; choroid plexus of fourth ventricle; epithelium of lens; More reference expression data
BioGPS	n/a
Gene ontology
Molecular function	alpha-N-acetylglucosaminidase activity; hydrolase activity; hydrolase activity, acting on glycosyl bonds
Cellular component	lysosome; lysosomal lumen; extracellular exosome
Biological process	metabolism; inner ear receptor cell development; lysosome organization; glycosaminoglycan catabolic process; retinal rod cell development; cerebellar Purkinje cell layer development; nervous system development; middle ear morphogenesis; locomotor rhythm
Sources:Amigo / QuickGO
Orthologs
Databases	NCBI: entry; OMA: entry
Species	Human	Mouse
Entrez	4669	27419
Ensembl	ENSG00000108784	ENSMUSG00000001751
UniProt	P54802	O88325
RefSeq (mRNA)	NM_000263	NM_013792
RefSeq (protein)	NP_000254	NP_038820
Location (UCSC)	Chr 17: 42.54 – 42.54 Mb	Chr 11: 100.96 – 100.97 Mb
PubMed search
- Wikidata
View/Edit Human	View/Edit Mouse

N-acetylglucosaminidase, alpha is a protein that in humans is encoded by the NAGLU gene.

== Function ==
This gene encodes an enzyme that degrades heparan sulfate by hydrolysis of terminal N-acetyl-D-glucosamine residues in N-acetyl-alpha-D-glucosaminides.

== Clinical significance ==
Defects in this gene are the cause of mucopolysaccharidosis type IIIB (MPS-IIIB), also known as Sanfilippo syndrome B. This disease is characterized by the lysosomal accumulation and urinary excretion of heparan sulfate.
