= N-acetylgalactosamine-4-sulfatase =

Identifiers
- EC no.: 3.1.6.12
- CAS no.: 55354-43-3

Databases
- IntEnz: IntEnz view
- BRENDA: BRENDA entry
- ExPASy: NiceZyme view
- KEGG: KEGG entry
- MetaCyc: metabolic pathway
- PRIAM: profile
- PDB structures: RCSB PDB PDBe PDBsum
Search
- PMC: articles
- PubMed: articles
- NCBI: proteins

N-acetylgalactosamine-4-sulfatase (EC 3.1.6.12, chondroitinsulfatase, chondroitinase, arylsulfatase B, acetylgalactosamine 4-sulfatase, N-acetylgalactosamine 4-sulfate sulfohydrolase) is an enzyme with systematic name N-acetyl-D-galactosamine-4-sulfate 4-sulfohydrolase. It catalyses the following reaction:

Hydrolysis of the 4-sulfate groups of the N-acetyl-D-galactosamine 4-sulfate units of chondroitin sulfate and dermatan sulfate.

It also acts on N-acetylglucosamine 4-sulfate.

== See also ==
- Arylsulfatase B
