= HGSNAT =

Protein-coding gene in the species Homo sapiens

Identifiers
- Aliases: HGSNAT, HGNAT, MPS3C, TMEM76, RP73, heparan-alpha-glucosaminide N-acetyltransferase
- External IDs: OMIM: 610453; MGI: 1196297; HomoloGene: 15586; GeneCards: HGSNAT; OMA:HGSNAT - orthologs

Gene location (Human)
Chr.	Chromosome 8 (human)
Band	8p11.21-p11.1	Start	43,140,464 bp
Band	8p11.21-p11.1	End	43,202,855 bp

Gene location (Mouse)
Chr.	Chromosome 8 (mouse)
Band	8 A2|8 14.22 cM	Start	26,434,481 bp
Band	8 A2|8 14.22 cM	End	26,466,781 bp
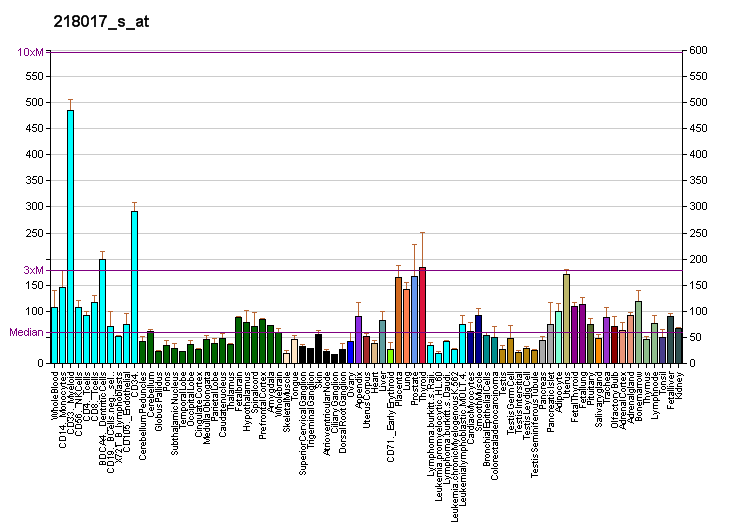
RNA expression pattern
Bgee	Human / Mouse (ortholog); Top expressed in: gastric mucosa; right uterine tube; stromal cell of endometrium; canal of the cervix; left ovary; right ovary; tibial nerve; left uterine tube; body of uterus; skin of leg / Top expressed in: stroma of bone marrow; granulocyte; decidua; adrenal gland; pontine nuclei; ankle; molar; left lobe of liver; optic nerve; medulla oblongata; More reference expression data
BioGPS	More reference expression data
Gene ontology
Molecular function	transferase activity; acyltransferase activity; heparan-alpha-glucosaminide N-acetyltransferase activity
Cellular component	integral component of membrane; lysosomal membrane; lysosome; membrane; plasma membrane; specific granule membrane; tertiary granule membrane
Biological process	lysosomal transport; glycosaminoglycan catabolic process; protein complex oligomerization; neutrophil degranulation
Sources:Amigo / QuickGO
Orthologs
Species	Human	Mouse
Entrez	138050	52120
Ensembl	ENSG00000165102	ENSMUSG00000037260
UniProt	Q68CP4	Q3UDW8
RefSeq (mRNA)	NM_152419; NM_001363227; NM_001363228; NM_001363229; NM_025070	NM_029884; NM_133970
RefSeq (protein)	NP_689632; NP_001350156; NP_001350157; NP_001350158	NP_084160
Location (UCSC)	Chr 8: 43.14 – 43.2 Mb	Chr 8: 26.43 – 26.47 Mb
PubMed search
- Wikidata
View/Edit Human	View/Edit Mouse

heparan-alpha-glucosaminide N-acetyltransferase

Identifiers
- EC no.: 2.3.1.78
- CAS no.: 79955-83-2

Databases
- IntEnz: IntEnz view
- BRENDA: BRENDA entry
- ExPASy: NiceZyme view
- KEGG: KEGG entry
- MetaCyc: metabolic pathway
- PRIAM: profile
- PDB structures: RCSB PDB PDBe PDBsum
- Gene Ontology: AmiGO / QuickGO
Search
- PMC: articles
- PubMed: articles
- NCBI: proteins

Heparan-α-glucosaminide N-acetyltransferase (also called "acetyl-CoA:heparan-α-D-glucosaminide N-acetyltransferase" and "acetyl-CoA:alpha-glucosaminide N-acetyltransferase") is an enzyme that in humans is encoded by the HGSNAT gene.

In enzymology, this enzyme belongs to the family of transferases, specifically those acyltransferases transferring groups other than aminoacyl groups. It is catalysed in the chemical reaction:

acetyl-CoA + heparan sulfate α-D-glucosaminide $\rightleftharpoons$ CoA + heparan sulfate N-acetyl-α-D-glucosaminide

This enzyme participates in glycosaminoglycan degradation and glycan structures degradation. Mutations in the gene encoding this enzyme cause mucopolysaccharidosis IIIC.
