= Α-N-Acetylglucosaminidase =

Class of enzymes

α-N-acetylglucosaminidase
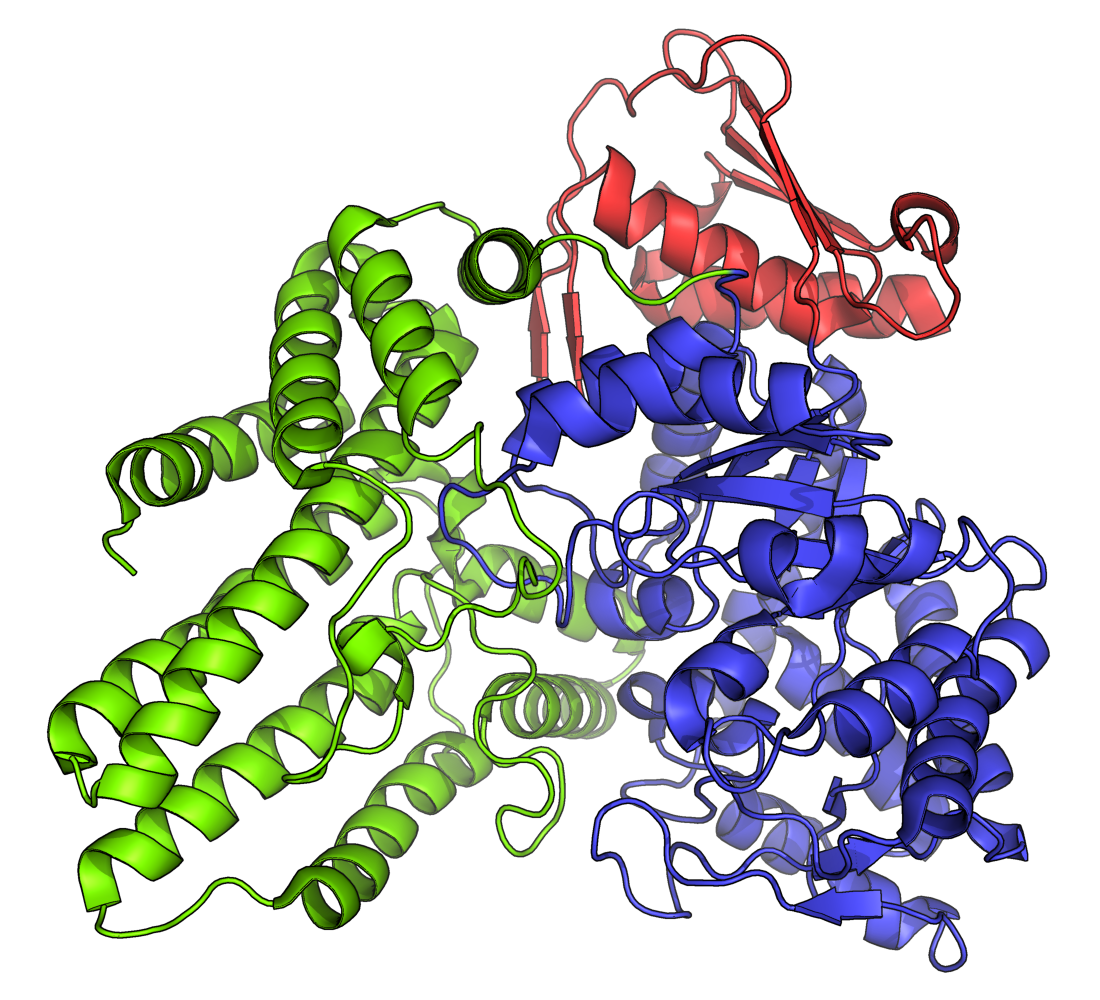
- Human α-N-acetylglucosaminidase coloured by domain. PDB: 4XWH

Identifiers
- Symbol: NAGLU
- NCBI gene: 4669
- HGNC: 7632
- OMIM: 609701
- RefSeq: NM_000263
- UniProt: P54802

Other data
- EC number: 3.2.1.50
- Locus: Chr. 17 q11-q21
Search for
- Structures: Swiss-model
- Domains: InterPro

The enzyme α-N-acetylglucosaminidase (EC 3.2.1.50, α-acetylglucosaminidase, N-acetyl-α-D-glucosaminidase, N-acetyl-α-glucosaminidase, α-D-2-acetamido-2-deoxyglucosidase) is a protein associated with Sanfilippo syndrome, with systematic name α-N-acetyl-D-glucosaminide N-acetylglucosaminohydrolase. It catalyses the hydrolysis of terminal non-reducing N-acetyl-D-glucosamine residues in N-acetyl-α-D-glucosaminides, and also UDP-N-acetylglucosamine.
