= Hereditary carrier =

Organism with a recessive genetic allele that does not display the recessive trait

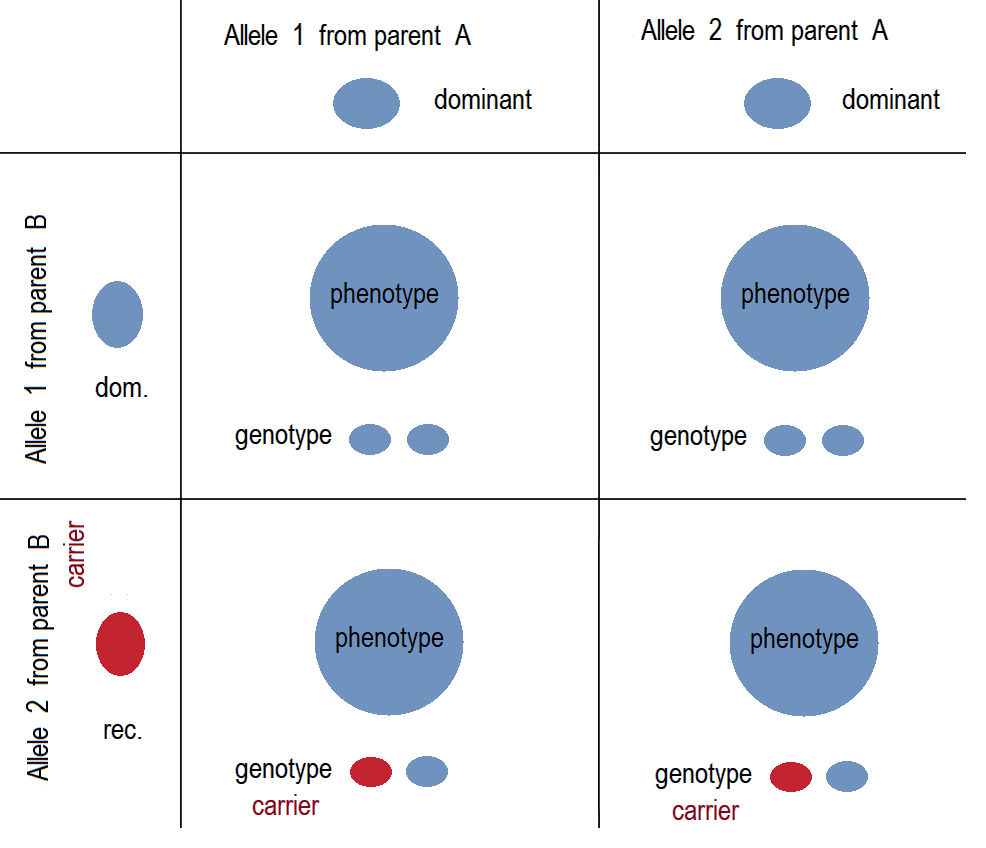
Punnett square: If the other parent does not have the recessive genetic disposition, it does not appear in the phenotype of the children, but on the average 50% of them become carriers.

A hereditary carrier (genetic carrier or just carrier) is a person or other organism that has inherited a recessive allele for a genetic trait or mutation but usually does not display that trait or show symptoms of the disease. Carriers are, however, able to pass the allele onto their offspring, who may then express the genetic trait.

== Carriers in autosomal inheritances ==
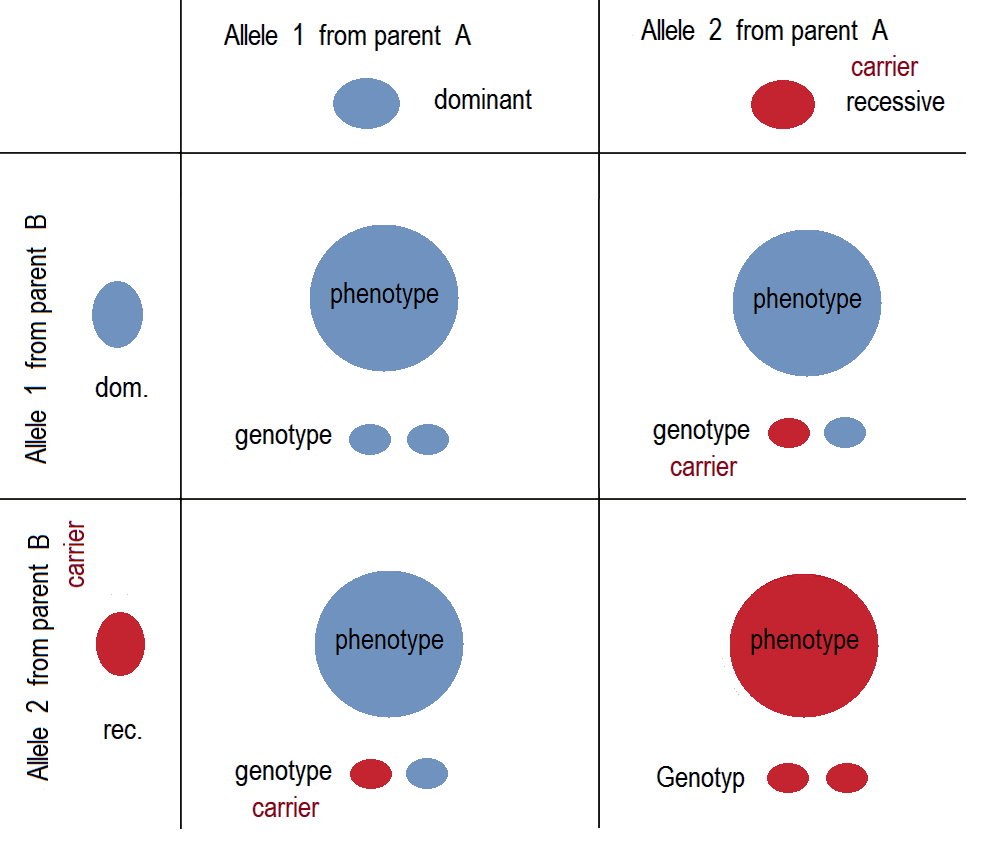
Punnett square: If both parents are carriers, on the average 25 % of the offspring have the recessive trait in phenotype and 50 % are carriers.

Autosomal dominant-recessive inheritance is made possible by the fact that the individuals of most species (including all higher animals and plants) have two alleles of most hereditary predispositions because the chromosomes in the cell nucleus are usually present in pairs (diploid). Carriers can be female or male as the autosomes are homologous independently from the sex.

In carriers the expression of a certain characteristic is recessive. The individual has both a genetic predisposition for the dominant trait and a genetic predisposition for the recessive trait, and the dominant expression prevails in the phenotype. In an individual which is heterozygous regarding a certain allele, it is not externally recognisable that it also has the recessive allele. But if the carrier has a child, the recessive trait appears in the phenotype, in case the descendant receives the recessive allele from both parents and therefore does not possess the dominant allele that would cover the recessive trait. According to Mendelian Law of Segregation of genes an average of 25% of the offspring become homozygous and express the recessive trait. Carriers can either pass on normal autosomal recessive hereditary traits or an autosomal recessive hereditary disease.

== Carriers in gonosomal inheritances ==
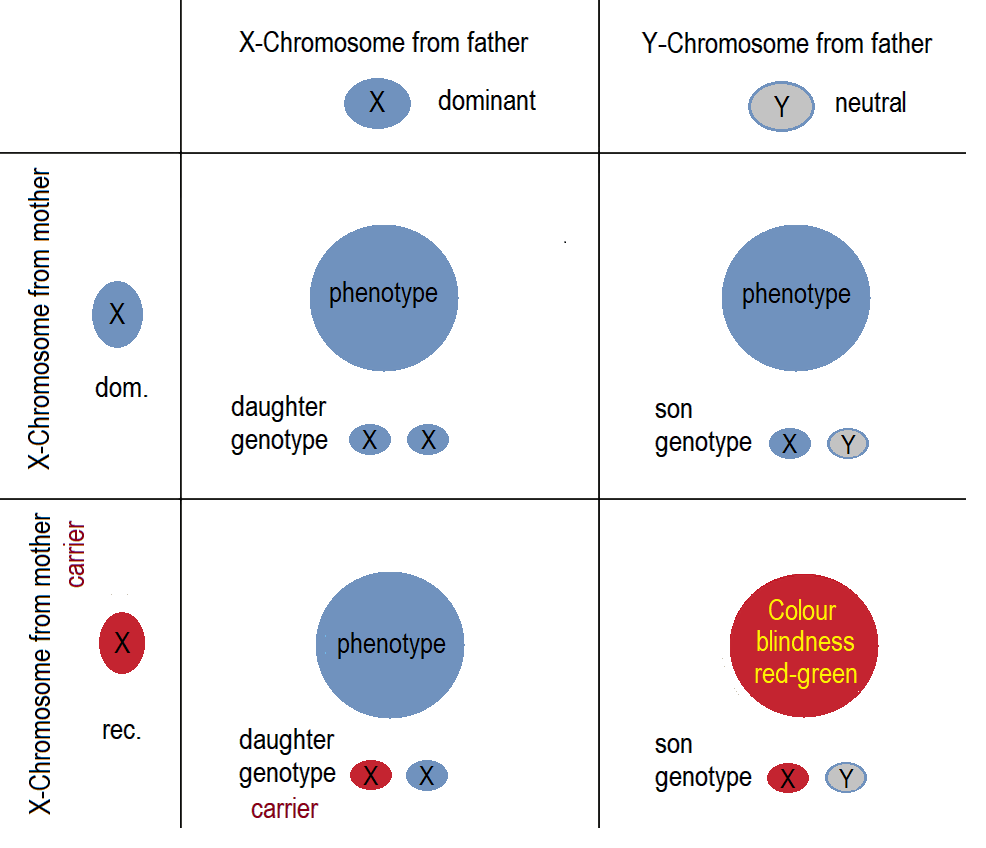
The mother is a carrier of the recessive hereditary disposition for Color blindness. The Y chromosome of the father cannot oppose this. The healthy allele on the X chromosome of the father can compensate for this in a daughter. She can see normally, but she becomes a conductor. The same pattern of inheritance applies to Haemophilia.

Gonosomal recessive genes are also passed on by carriers. The term is used in human genetics in cases of hereditary traits in which the observed trait lies on the female sex chromosome, the X chromosome. These are sex-linked genes. The carriers are always women. Women have two homologous sex chromosomes (XX). Men cannot be carriers because they only have one X chromosome. If a man has a certain recessive genetic disposition on his X chromosome, this is called hemizygous and it gets phenotypically expressed.

Although the Y chromosome is not a really homologous chromosome and carries relatively little genetic information compared to X chromosomes, a genetic component on the Y chromosome can come to expression because there is no homologous chromosome with an allele which could overlay it.

Examples of traits inherited via the X chromosome are color blindness and the most common hereditary form of haemophilia which therefore affect men much more often than women.

Inheritance by female carriers

Queen Victoria, and her daughters Princesses Alice and Beatrix, were carriers of the hemophilia gene (an abnormal allele of a gene, necessary to produce one of the blood clotting factors). Both had children who continued to pass on the gene to succeeding generations of the royal houses of Spain and Russia, into which they married. Since males only have one X chromosome, males who carried the altered gene had hemophilia B. Those female children who inherited the altered gene were asymptomatic carriers who also would have passed it to half of their children.

Gonosomal dominant inheritances are also known. There are no carriers since owners of a dominant hereditary disposition phenotypically express the trait in each case.
