= Dermatan sulfate =

Glycosaminoglycan found in animals

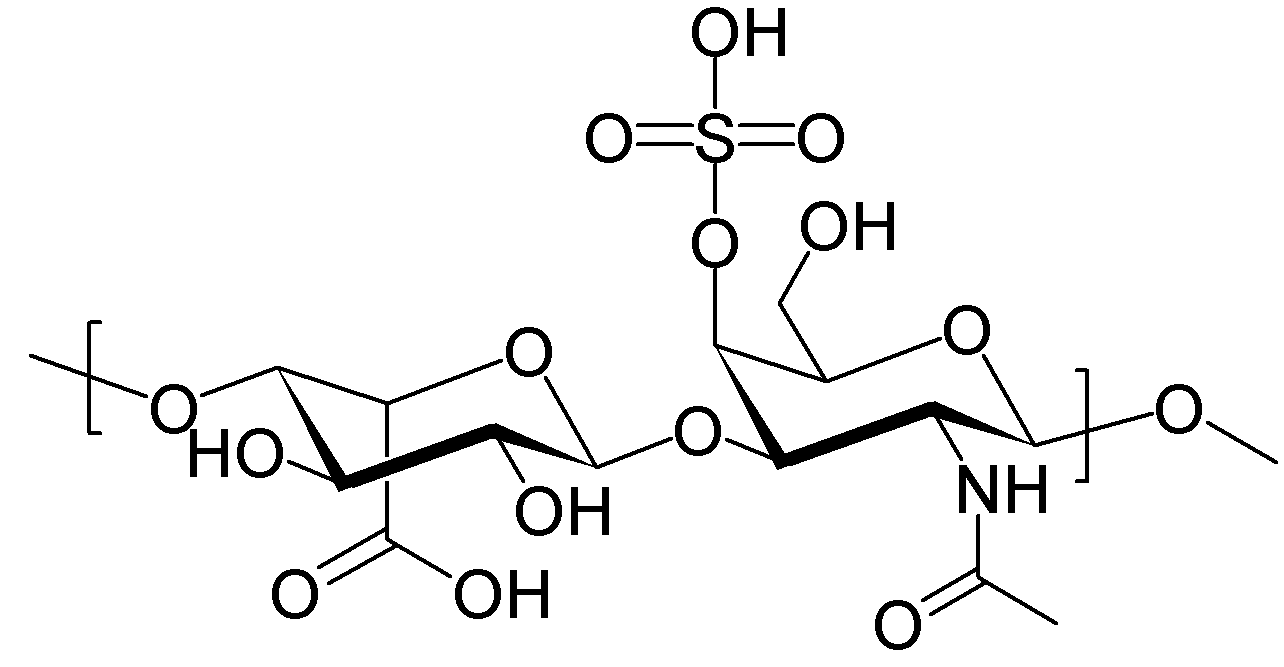

Clinical data
- AHFS/Drugs.com: International Drug Names
- ATC code: B01AX04 (WHO)

Identifiers
- CAS Number: 24967-94-0
- ChemSpider: none
- UNII: J3OC7JVS54
- CompTox Dashboard (EPA): DTXSID40179683
- ECHA InfoCard: 100.042.305

Chemical and physical data
- Formula: C_{14}H_{21}NO_{15}S
- Molar mass: 475.37 g·mol^{−1}

Dermatan sulfate is a glycosaminoglycan (formerly called a mucopolysaccharide) found mostly in skin, but also in blood vessels, heart valves, tendons, and lungs.

It is also referred to as chondroitin sulfate B, although it is no longer classified as a form of chondroitin sulfate by most sources. The formula is C_{14}H_{21}NO_{15}S. This carbohydrate is composed of linear polymers of disaccharide units that contain, iduronic acid (IdoA) and N-acetyl galactosamine (GalNAc). These repeating units are sulfated at a variety of positions. Dermatan sulfate is a component of the compound sulodexide.

== Function ==
Dermatan sulfate may have roles in coagulation, cardiovascular disease, carcinogenesis, infection, wound repair, maintaining the shape of galactosamine 4-sulfate, skin, and fibrosis.

== Pathology ==
Dermatan sulfate accumulates abnormally in several of the mucopolysaccharidosis disorders.

An excess of dermatan sulfate in the mitral valve is characteristic of myxomatous degeneration of the leaflets leading to redundancy of valve tissue and ultimately, mitral valve prolapse (into the left atrium) and insufficiency. This chronic prolapse occurs mainly in women over the age of 60, and can predispose the patient to mitral annular calcification. Mitral valve insufficiency can lead to eccentric (volume dependent or dilated) hypertrophy and eventually left heart failure if untreated.

== See also ==
- Iduronic acid
