= SULF1 =

Protein-coding gene in the species Homo sapiens

Identifiers
- Aliases: SULF1, HSULF-1, SULF-1, sulfatase 1
- External IDs: OMIM: 610012; MGI: 2138563; GeneCards: SULF1
Enzyme activity
EC #	BRENDA	ExPASy	KEGG	MetaCyc
3.1.6.1	↗	↗	↗	↗
3.1.6.14	↗	↗	↗	↗

Gene location (Human)
Chr.	Chromosome 8 (human)
Band	8q13.2-q13.3	Start	69,466,624 bp
Band	8q13.2-q13.3	End	69,660,915 bp

Gene location (Mouse)
Chr.	Chromosome 1 (mouse)
Band	1|1 A3	Start	12,762,501 bp
Band	1|1 A3	End	12,931,416 bp
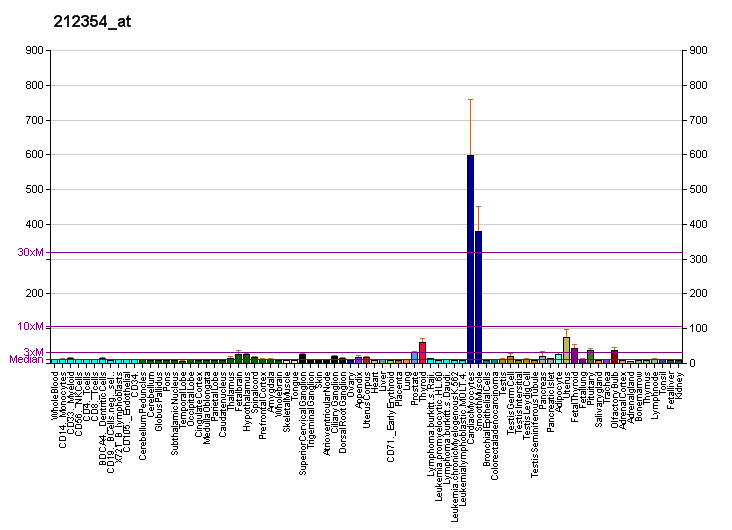

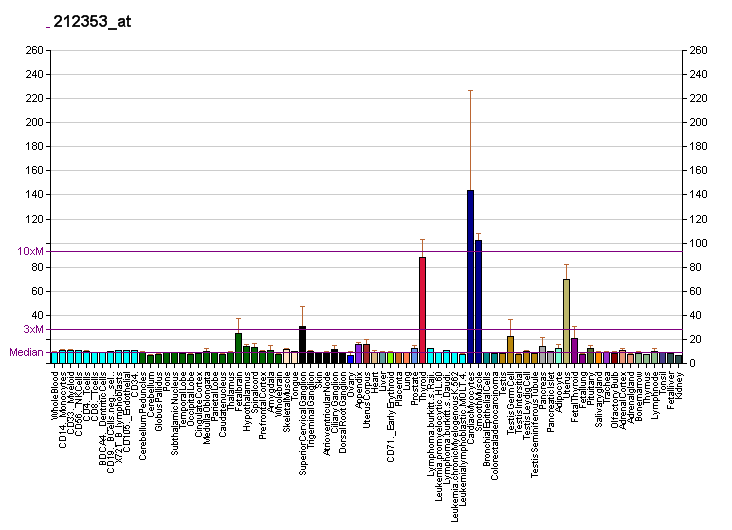

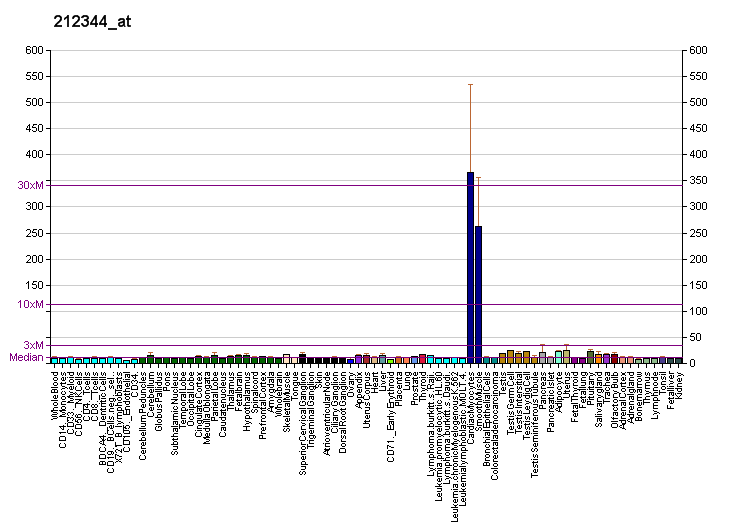
RNA expression pattern
Bgee	Human / Mouse (ortholog); Top expressed in: parietal pleura; stromal cell of endometrium; retinal pigment epithelium; germinal epithelium; right coronary artery; Descending thoracic aorta; ascending aorta; saphenous vein; Epithelium of choroid plexus; visceral pleura / Top expressed in: vestibular membrane of cochlear duct; otolith organ; utricle; Epithelium of choroid plexus; hand; retinal pigment epithelium; ascending aorta; aortic valve; epithelium of lens; internal carotid artery; More reference expression data
BioGPS	More reference expression data
Gene ontology
Molecular function	N-acetylglucosamine-6-sulfatase activity; sulfuric ester hydrolase activity; calcium ion binding; catalytic activity; hydrolase activity; metal ion binding; arylsulfatase activity; glycosaminoglycan binding
Cellular component	endoplasmic reticulum; membrane raft; cell surface; plasma membrane; Golgi apparatus; Golgi stack; extracellular space; collagen-containing extracellular matrix
Biological process	negative regulation of angiogenesis; heparan sulfate proteoglycan metabolic process; esophagus smooth muscle contraction; glomerular basement membrane development; regulation of fibroblast growth factor receptor signaling pathway; negative regulation of fibroblast growth factor receptor signaling pathway; glomerular filtration; negative regulation of endothelial cell proliferation; negative regulation of prostatic bud formation; kidney development; positive regulation of Wnt signaling pathway; vascular endothelial growth factor receptor signaling pathway; embryonic skeletal system development; bone development; positive regulation of vascular endothelial growth factor production; chondrocyte development; apoptotic process; metabolism; positive regulation of BMP signaling pathway; negative regulation of cell migration; glial cell-derived neurotrophic factor receptor signaling pathway; cartilage development; innervation
Sources:Amigo / QuickGO
Orthologs
Databases	NCBI: entry; OMA: entry
Species	Human	Mouse
Entrez	23213	240725
Ensembl	ENSG00000137573	ENSMUSG00000016918
UniProt	Q8IWU6	Q8K007
RefSeq (mRNA)	NM_001128204; NM_001128205; NM_001128206; NM_015170	NM_001198565; NM_001198566; NM_172294
RefSeq (protein)	NP_001121676; NP_001121677; NP_001121678; NP_055985	NP_001185494; NP_001185495; NP_758498
Location (UCSC)	Chr 8: 69.47 – 69.66 Mb	Chr 1: 12.76 – 12.93 Mb
PubMed search
- Wikidata
View/Edit Human	View/Edit Mouse

Sulfatase 1, also known as SULF1, is an enzyme which in humans is encoded by the SULF1 gene.

Heparan sulfate proteoglycans (HSPGs) act as co-receptors for numerous heparin-binding growth factors and cytokines and are involved in cell signaling. Heparan sulfate 6-O-endo-sulfatases, such as SULF1, selectively remove 6-O-sulfate groups from heparan sulfate. This activity modulates the effects of heparan sulfate by altering binding sites for signaling molecules.

== Function ==
Heparan sulfate proteoglycans (HSPGs) are widely expressed throughout most tissues of nearly all multicellular species. The function of HSPGs extends beyond providing an extracellular matrix (ECM) structure and scaffold for cells. They are integral regulators of essential cell signaling pathways affecting cell growth, proliferation, differentiation, and migration. Although the core protein is important, the large heparan sulfate (HS) chains extending from the core are responsible for most receptor signaling. HS chains are heterogeneous structures that differ in specific and conditional cell contexts. Of particular importance is the HS sulfation pattern, which was once thought to be static after HS biosynthesis in the Golgi. However, this paradigm changed after the discovery of two extracellular 6-O-S glucosamine arylsulfatases, Sulf1 and Sulf2. These two enzymes allow rapid extracellular modification of sulfate content in HSPGs, impacting signaling involving Shh, Wnt, BMP, FGF, VEGF, HB-EGF, GDNF, and HGF. In addition, Sulfs may exercise another level of regulation over HS composition by down or upregulating HS biosynthetic enzymes present in the Golgi through the very same signaling pathways they modify.

== Discovery ==
Before the cloning and characterization of Sulf1 and Sulf2, HS composition was thought to be unchanging after localization to the cell surface. However, this changed when the quail orthologue of Sulf1, QSulf1, was identified in a screen for Sonic hedgehog (Shh) response genes activated during somite formation in quail embryos. Sequence alignment analysis indicates QSsulf1 is homologous with lysosomal N-acetyl glucosamine sulfatases (G6-sulfatases) that catalyze the hydrolysis of 6-O sulfates from N-acetyl glucosamines of heparan sulfate during the degradation of HSPGs. In contrast to lysosomal active sulfatases, QSulf1 localizes exclusively to the cell surface by interacting hydrophilically with a non-heparan sulfate outer membrane component, and is enzymatically active at a neutral pH. By mutating the catalytically active cysteines to alanine, thereby blocking N-formylglycine formation, they found QSulf1 was responsible for Wingless (Wnt) release from HS chains to activate the Frizzled receptor; this was the first evidence that an extracellular sulf was capable of modifying HS and therefore cell signaling. The overall structure of QSulf is followed closely by its orthologues and paralogues, including human and mouse. The human and murine orthologues of QSulf1, HSulf1 and MSulf1, respectively, were cloned and characterized after the discovery of QSulf1. In addition, a paralogue, Sulf2, sharing 63-65% identity (both mouse and human) with Sulf1 also was discovered through BLAST sequence analysis. The HSulf1 gene (GenBank accession number AY101175) has an open reading frame of 2616 bp, encoding a protein of 871 amino acid (aa), and HSulf2 (GenBank accession number AY101176) has an open reading frame of 2613 bp, encoding a protein of 870 aa. The HSulf1 and 2 genes localize to 8q13.2-13.3 and 20q13.12, respectively. They contain putative Asn-linked glycosylation sites, and furin cleavage sites responsible for proteolytic processing in the Golgi. The function or substrate specificity these cleavage sites impart has yet to be determined.

Validation of the predicted N-linked glycosylation sites on QSulf1 were performed using tunicamycin and QSulf1 variants missing the N-terminal (catalytic) domain or HD, which contain predicted N-linked glycosylation sites. The N- and C-terminal showed unbranched N-linked glycosylation, but was absent in the hydrophilic domain even though it contains two putative sites. In addition, O-linked or sialylated glycosylation were not present in QSulf1. Importantly, proper glycosylation is necessary to localize to the cell surface, possibly to bind HS moieties, and was required for enzymatic activity.

== Structure and mechanism ==
Sulf1 and Sulf2 are new members of a superfamily of arylsulfatases, being closely related to arylsulfatase A, B (ARSA; ARSB) and glucosamine 6-sulfatase (G6S). The x-ray crystal structure of neither Sulf1 or Sulf2 has been attempted, but ARSA active site crystal structure was deciphered. In ARSA, the conserved cysteine, which is posttranslationally modified to a C alpha formylglycine (FG) is critical for catalytic activity. In the first step, one of the two oxygens of the aldehyde hydrate attacks the sulfur of the sulfate ester. This leads to a transesterification of the sulfate group onto the aldehyde hydrate. Simultaneously the substrate alcohol is released. In the second step, sulfate is eliminated from the enzyme-sulfate intermediate by an intramolecular rearrangement. The “intramolecular hydrolysis” allows the aldehyde group to be regenerated. The active site of ARSA contains nine conserved residues that were found to be critical for catalytic activity. Some residues, such as Lys123 and Lys302, bind the substrate while others either participate in catalysis directly, such as His125 and Asp281, or indirectly. In addition a magnesium ion is needed to coordinate the oxygen that attacks the sulfur in the first step of sulfate cleavage. The crystal structure and residue mutations need to be performed in Sulf1 and Sulf2 to determine if any differences exist from lysosomal sulfatases.

== Enzymatic specificity ==
HS enzymatic specificity of QSulf1 was first analyzed. QSulf1 enzymatic specificity on 6-O sulfates was linked to the trisulfated disaccharides (HexA,2SGlcNS,6S) in S domains of HS (HS regions where most of the GlcNS residues are in contiguous sequences) and not NA/NS domains (regions of alternating N-acetylated and N-sulfated units; transition zones). Sulf1 and 2 null murine embryonic fibroblasts were generated to test the HS specificity of mammalian Sulf as opposed to avian Sulf (QSulf). Investigators found mSulf1−/−;mSulf2−/− HS showed overall large increases in all 6S disaccharides. Cooperativity between mSulf1/2 was found because a 2-fold increase in S-domain-associated disaccharides (UA–GlcNS(6S) and UA(2S)–GlcNS(6S)) was observed in double knock-out HS as compared with either single knock-out HS alone. However, one difference from mSulf1 is that mSulf2−/− HS shows an increase in 6S almost exclusively within the non-sulfated and transition zones. This sulfation effect on non-sulfated and transition zones is also different from QSulfs, which catalyze desulfation exclusively in S-domains. Although 6S changes were dominant, other small changes in NS and 2S sulfation do occur in the Sulf knock out MEFs, which may be a compensatory mechanism. Further biochemical studies elucidated specificity and localization of human Sulfs 1 and 2. Sulf1 and 2 hydrophilic domains associate with the cell membrane components through electrostatic interactions and not by integration with into the lipid bilayer. In addition to cell membrane association, Sulfs also secreted freely into the media, which contrasts the findings with QSulf1 and 2. Biochemical analysis of HSPGs in Sulf 1 and 2 knockout MEFS reveal enzyme specificities to disulfated and, primarily, trisulfated 6S disaccharide units UA-GlcNS(6S) and UA(2S)-GlcNS(6S) within the HS chain, with specific exclusion of monosulfated disaccharide units. In vivo studies, however, demonstrate that loss of Sulf1 and Sulf2 result in sulfation changes of nonsubstrates (UA-GlcNAc(6S), N and 2-O Sulfate), indicating Sulf modulates HS biosynthetic machinery. This was further demonstrated by PCR analysis, showing dynamic changes in HS biosynthesis enzymes after Sulf1 and 2 loss. Also, the authors showed in an MEF model system, that Sulf1 and Sulf2 definitively and differentially modify HS proteoglycan fractions including cell surface, GPI-anchored (glypican), shed, and ECM-associated proteoglycans.

== Role in cancer ==
The next section gives a detailed description of Sulf1 and Sulf2's involvement in cancer. Much of what is known about signaling pathways mediated by Sulfs has been determined through investigating extracellular Sulf role and function in cancer. Therefore, they will be described in tandem. Additionally, this emphasizes how small changes in HS sulfation patterns have major impacts in health and disease.

=== Ovarian cancer ===
The first signs of Sulf1 dysregulation were found in ovarian cancer. The expression of Sulf1 mRNA was found to be downregulated or absent in a majority of ovarian cancer specimens. The same investigators also found lowered mRNA expression in breast, pancreatic, and hepatic malignant cell lines. This absent or hypomorhic Sulf1 expression results in highly sulfated HSPGs. The lack of Sulf1 expression also augments heparin binding-epidermal growth factor (HB-EGF) response by way of greater EGF Receptor (EGFR) and extracellular signal-regulated kinase (ERK) signaling, which are common signatures of ovarian cancer. Even further, Sulf1 N-terminal sulfatase activity was specifically required for cisplatin-induced apoptosis of the ovarian cancer cell line, OV207. The mechanism by which Sulf1 is downregulated in ovarian cancer was investigated. Epigenetic silencing of CpG sites within Sulf1 exon 1A by methylation is associated with ovarian cancer cells and primary ovarian cancer tissues lacking Sulf1 expression. Furthermore, CpG sites showed increased levels of histone H3 K9 methylation in Sulf1 negative ovarian cancer cell lines.

=== Breast cancer ===
Breast cancer expression of Sulf1 at the mRNA level was shown to be downregulated. Investigations into this relationship revealed that angiogenesis in breast cancer was shown to be regulated in part by Sulf1. Breast cancer xenografts overexpressing Sulf1 in athymic mice showed marked decreases in angiogenesis. Specifically, Sulf1 inhibited the ability of vascular endothelial cell heparan sulfate to participate in complex formation with FGF-2, thereby abolishing growth signaling. FGF-2 is a HB-GF, requiring the formation of a ternary complex with HS and the FGF Receptor (FGFR) to cause receptor dimerization, activation, and autophosphorylation, which then leads to induction of the mitogen-activated protein kinase (MAPK) pathway (in addition to other pathways). This results in several responses including cell proliferation and angiogenesis. Importantly, this response is dependent upon the degree and signature of HS-GAG sulfation. To further validate the response in breast cancer, human umbilical vein endothelial cells (HUVECs), overexpressing Sulf1 inhibited vascular endothelial growth factor 165 (VEGF165) signaling which is dependent upon HS, but not HS-independent VEGF121. Sulf2 also was implicated in breast cancer. In contrast to Sulf1, Sulf2 was upregulated at both the mRNA and protein levels in tumor tissue in two mammary carcinoma mouse models.

Sulf1 displays regulation of amphiregulin and HB-EGF-mediated autocrine and paracrine signaling in breast cancer. Loss of Sulf1 in a breast cancer cell line, MDA-MB-468, shows increased ERK1/2 and EGFR activation, which was shown to be mediated by HB-EGF and amphiregulin, which require complexes with specifically sulfated HS. Breast cancer samples show loss of Sulf1 expression in invasive lobular carcinomas. These carcinomas are predominantly, estrogen receptor (ER) and progesterone receptor (PR)-positive, and HER-2, p53, and EGFR-negative (markers indicating increased aggressiveness of breast cancer), but do not confer an increased survival. The authors suggest that enhanced amphiregulin and HB-EGF signaling due to a lack of Sulf1, and therefore oversulfation of HS, may make lobular carcinomas more aggressive than expected. The mechanism by which Sulf1 is downregulated in breast cancer (and gastric cancer) was further investigated. The authors found aberrant hypermethylation of the Sulf1 promoter in both breast cancer and gastric cancer cell lines and patient samples, leading to a reduction of Sulf1 expression, which is similar to ovarian cancer.

Despite this evidence, disagreements are found in the literature regarding the role of Sulf in breast cancer. In contrast to previous reports, Sulf1 transcript expression was highly upregulated in invasive ductal carcinoma with respect to confined ductal carcinoma in situ. The authors, therefore, propose that Sulf1 is involved in the acquisition of the capacity to invade adjacent tissues in ductal carcinoma in situ.

=== Hepatocellular carcinoma ===
Cancer cell lines with downregulation of Sulf1 were investigated in the same fashion as ovarian cancer. Nine of 11 hepatocellular carcinoma (HCC) cell lines displayed either absent or severely reduced levels of Sulf1 mRNA. Less than half of HCC tumor samples showed loss of heterozygosity (LOH), and DNA methylation inhibition treatment of Sulf1 absent HCC cell lines reactivated the expression of Sulf1, indicating hypermethylation may be partly responsible for its downregulation. As in ovarian cancer, loss of Sulf1 largely contributed to decreased HPSG sulfation in HCC. In addition, Sulf1 expression is required to suppress sustained activation of ERK1/2 and c-met by the heparin binding growth factors (HB-GF), fibroblast growth factor (FGF) and hepatocyte growth factor (HGF), thereby decreasing cell proliferation. In extension, Sulf1 mediated HCC cell apoptotic sensitivity to cisplatin and staurosporine. As a review, HGF, or scatter factor, activates its receptor c-Met which activates mitogen-activated protein/extracellular signal-regulated kinase kinase (MEK) and PI3K signaling that are ultimately responsible for expression of proangiogenic factors, interleukin-8 (IL-8) and vascular endothelial growth factor (VEGF). The HGF/c-Met axis mediates the invasive growth phenotype necessary for metastasis through coordination of cell motility and degradation of extracellular matrix (ECM).

In vivo studies on HCC found Sulf1 overexpressing HCC xenografts displayed delayed tumor growth in mice, and the mechanism involves inhibition of histone deacetylase (HDAC). Sulf1 enhances acetylation of Histone H4 by inhibiting HDAC, which subsequently inhibits the activation of the MAPK and Akt pathways ultimately decreasing HCC tumorogenesis.

Sulf2's role in HCC contrasted with Sulf1. Sulf2 was upregulated in a majority of HCCs and HCC cell lines, and Sulf2 knockdown eliminated migration and proliferation. Sulf2 also upregulated glypican-3, which is commonly overexpressed in HCC, by increasing ERK, AKT activation through enhanced FGF2 signaling. GPC3 is important in Sulf2-enhanced FGF signaling in vitro, so glypican-3 may mediate its own upregulation through Sulf2. Given that Sulf1 and Sulf2 have redundant functions, Sulf2 contrasting function in HCC was unexpected.

=== Pancreatic cancer ===
Sulf1 mRNA expression in pancreatic cancer differed from ovarian and liver cancer. Only 50% of pancreatic cancer cell lines tested exhibited a significant decrease in Sulf1. Further, in situ hybridization demonstrated that Sulf1 mRNA expression was not uniformly absent in pancreatic cancer tissue. In fact, Sulf1 was present weakly in normal acinar cells, but present at high levels in the endothelium and malignant cells in pancreatic cancer tissue (Li, Kleeff et al. 2005). This indicates that downregulation of Sulf1 is not a ubiquitous process in carcinogenesis. Nevertheless, endogenous expression of Sulf1 in a Sulf1-negative pancreatic cancer cell line, PANC-1, inhibited FGF-2 signaling, but did not affect HB-EGF, EGF, or insulin-like growth factor-1 (IGF-1) signaling, indicating cell specific effects. In further contrast to ovarian cancer and HCC, Hsulf-1 expressing Panc-1 cells were more resistant to gemcitabine, suggesting Hsulf-1 over-expression might confer increased chemoresistance, and therefore a growth advantage, to pancreatic cancer cells. In further reports Sulf1 displays a complicated expression pattern in pancreatic cancer that is more than merely up or downregulation. For instance, primary pancreatic cancer show higher sulfated HSPGs indicating a lack of Sulf1, but upon metastasis sulfation of HSPGs is reduced. Corroborating patient data were mouse tumor in vivo studies of Sulf1 overexpressing Panc-1 cells showing decreased growth, but increased local invasiveness.

=== Other cancers ===
In vivo studies were used to investigate HSulf1 and 2 in myeloma. Myeloma cells overexpressing Sulf1 and 2 were subcutaneously injected in severe combined immunodeficient (SCID) mice. Enhanced Sulf expression markedly inhibited growth of these tumors with respect to the control. Again, FGF-2 signaling and subsequent phosphorylation of ERK was attenuated in vitro by both Sulf1 and Sulf2 expression. Sulf1/2 expression resulted in more ECM (collagen fibril deposition) than control tumors, which may be another mechanism by which Sulfs slow down tumor growth. The authors also find Sulf1/2 specifically acts on HS-GAGs on the surface of tumor cells and not in the surrounding stroma, which consequently acts to block FGF-2/FGFR/HS ternary complex formation and inhibition of a downstream signal.

Squamous cell head and neck carcinoma (SCCHN) has three cell lines lacking Sulf1 expression. Transfected-in Sulf1 expression reduces FGF-2 and HGF-mediated phosphorylation and activation of ERK and phosphatidylinositol 3'-kinase (PI3K)/Akt pathways. Without these active pathways, a marked decreased in proliferation and mitogenecity is observed. Sulf1 expression even attenuates cell motility and invasion mediated by HGF, implicating Sulf1 loss in metastasis.

== Animal models ==
In addition to cancer, Sulf1 and Sulf2 were studied with respect to normal development including neural, muscle, vasculogenesis and skeletal development. Recently, much of what is known was from studies on Sulf1/2 knockout mice.

=== Skeletal development ===
Through common genetrapping mechanisms, homozygous MSulf2 mice were created to assess the in vivo phenotypic traits. Strain specific nonpenetrant lethality resulted (48% fewer than expected), pups were smaller, and some lung defects were observed, but MSulf2-/- were largely as healthy and viable as wild type litter mates. MSulf2 nulls indicate MSulf1 and MSulf2 may have overlapping functions in regulating sulfation patterns in HSPGs. Given that MSulf2 null mice did not present major abnormal phenotypes double MSulf1/2 knockouts were generated. Again, MSulf1 and MSulf2 nulls individually did not display damaging phenotypes; however MSulf-/-;MSulf2-/- mice showed highly penetrant perinatal lethality. However, some double null mice survived into adulthood, and displayed smaller stature, skeletal lesions, and unusually small but functioning kidneys. The skeletal lesions (axial and appendicular skeleton showing decreases in ossified bone volume; sternal fusion and defective basisphenoid patterning) display similar phenotype to heparan sulfate 2-O-transferase (Hs2st)-deficient mice, BMP deficient mice and hypermorphic Fgfr1 and 3 mice. This provides evidence that Sulf1 and 2 is linked to HS modulation effecting BMP and FGF. In addition, this confirms that Sulf1 and 2 perform overlapping functions, but are needed for survival. Further studies on MSulf1-/-;MSulf2-/- mice extended the role of Sulfs in skeletal development. Double nulls displayed reduced bone length, premature ossification, and sternum and tail vertebrae fusion (Ratzka, Kalus et al. 2008). Also, the zone of proliferating chondrocytes was reduced by 90%, indicating defects in chondrogenesis.

The important role Sulf1 and Sulf2 in skeletal development is not surprising given its regulation of bone-related growth factors. For example, QSulf1 reduces specific HS 6-O sulfation which releases Noggin, an inhibitor of bone morphogenetic protein (BMP), allowing cells to become BMP-4 responsive. Therefore, this directly links Sulf1 to the complex developmental patterning mediated by BMPs. Wnt signaling also is regulated by QSulf1. Investigators found lowered Wnt activation through the Frizzled receptor in the absence of QSulf1 expression in non-expressing embryonic cells. 6-O sulfate HS binds with highly affinity to Wnt, abrogating receptor activation. QSulf1 is required to desulfate 6-O chains, not entirely releasing Wnt but lowering the affinity with HS. This low affinity complex then binds and activates the Frizzled receptor.

Additional studies emphasized the role of Sulfs in chondrogenesis. The role of QSulf1 was determined in quail cartilage development and joint formation because of its association with chondrogenic growth factor signaling (Wnt and BMP). Sulf1 was expressed highly in condensing mesenchyme and, in cell culture, caused prechondrocytes to differentiate into chondrocytes, indicating QSulf1 is needed for early chondrogenesis. QSulf1 displayed perichondrial staining during early development but was downregulated during later stages of development. In addition, QSulf1 shows transient expression in the early joint line followed by its rapid loss of expression in later stages of joint development, suggesting it would have an inhibitory effect in later joint development. Because Sulfs were important in normal chondrogenesis, they were investigated in cartilage diseases. Expression patterns of Sulf1 and Sulf2 were determined in normal and osteoarthritic (AO) cartilage. Both Sulf1 and Sulf2 showed enhanced expression in OA and aging cartilage. Given several HSPGs (perlecan, syndecan 1/3, glypican) are upregulated and growth factor signaling through FGF-2, Wnt, BMP, and Noggin are modulated in OA, Sulfs and the modifications of HS may mediate an entirely new level of control over OA development.

=== Nervous system development ===
Sulf null mice and other model systems implicated Sulfs in other developmental and disease systems. For example, studies detected esophageal defects in surviving MSulf-/-;MSulf2-/- adult mice. Specifically, esophagi had impaired smooth muscle contractility with reduced neuronal innervation and enteric glial cell numbers. It was postulated to be mediated by decreased glial-derived neurotrophic factor (GDNF), which is responsible for neurite sprouting in the embryonic esophagus. Sulf expression is not obligatory for GDNF signaling, but it does enhance the signal greatly. MSulf1 and 2 are believed to decrease 6-O sulfation, releasing GDNF from HS to bind and activate its receptor, thereby mediating its effects on esophageal innervation. Sulf1 even functions in basic neural development. Sulf1 modulation of HS chains sulfation is critical in nervous system development. Specifically, Sufl1 expression leads to the switch of ventral neural progenitor cells toward an oligodendroglial fate by modulating Shh distribution and increasing signaling on apical neuroepithelial cells.

=== Muscle development and other regulation ===
Sulf1 and 2 also display regulation over muscle development, angiogenesis, leukocyte rolling and wound healing. In adult mice, Sulf1 and Sulf2 have overlapping functions in regulating muscle regeneration. Functionally, Sulfs cooperatively desulfate HS 6-O present on activated satellite cells to suppress FGF2 signaling and therefore promote myogenic differentiation to regenerate muscle. Because of this role, Sulfs may have a direct role in diseases such as muscular dystrophy. QSulf1 was used as a tool to either decrease sulfation of HS or increase sulfation by employing a dominant negative QSulf1 (DNQSulf1). Vascular smooth muscle cells (VSMC) are highly influenced by degrees of HS sulfation. Overexpression of QSulf1 decreased adhesion, and increased proliferation and apoptosis of VSMC, while DNQSulf1 also decreased adhesion and increased proliferation, apoptosis, migration and chemotaxis of VSMC. Displaying cell specific effects, both overexpression of Sulf1 and DNQSulf1 increased ERK1/2 phosphorylation in VSMCs, a different response from cancer cell lines. Essentially, these experiments display that a fine-tuned 6-O sulfation pattern is needed for proper function of VSMCs.

Sulf2 was investigated with respect to angiogenesis in a chick model. In contrast to Sulf1, Sulf2 actually induced angiogenesis in a chick chorioallantoic membrane assay. Sulf2 was measured for its ability to modulate binding of growth factors to trisulfated disaccharide motif heparin and HS. Sulf2 inhibited both pre- and post-binding of VEGF165, FGF-1, and SDF-1, a HS-binding chemokine, to both heparin and HS. Investigators hypothesize that Sulf-2 may mobilize ECM-sequestered angiogenic factors, increasing their bioavailability to endothelial cells that express the appropriate receptors.

Investigators found that HSPGs such as perlecan and collagen type XVIII are modified during human renal ischemia/reperfusion, which is associated with severe endothelial damage. Vascular basement membrane (BM) HSPGs are modified to bind L-selectin and monocyte chemoattractant protein-1 (MCP-1) during leukocyte infiltration. Specifically, they require 6-0 sulfation to bind HS chains. The authors show evidence and propose that Sulf1 is usually present on microvascular BM but is downregulated to allow resulfation of 6-O HS for binding of L-selectin and MCP-1. This in turn implicates Sulf1 in human renal allograft rejection which is highly dependent upon HSPG function in peritubular capillaries.

Finally, in a transcriptome wide assay in chronic wound, fortyfold higher expression Sulf1 was noted in wound-site vessels. This increase was attributed to its ability to inhibit angiogenesis as it had in breast cancer models.
