= Formylglycine-generating enzyme =

Identifiers
- EC no.: 1.8.99

Databases
- BRENDA: enzyme data
- ExPASy: NiceZyme view
- KEGG: enzyme entry
- MetaCyc: metabolic pathway
- Rhea: reactions
- PDB structures: RCSB PDB PDBe PDBsum
Search
- PMC: articles
- PubMed: articles
- NCBI: proteins

Formylglycine-generating enzyme
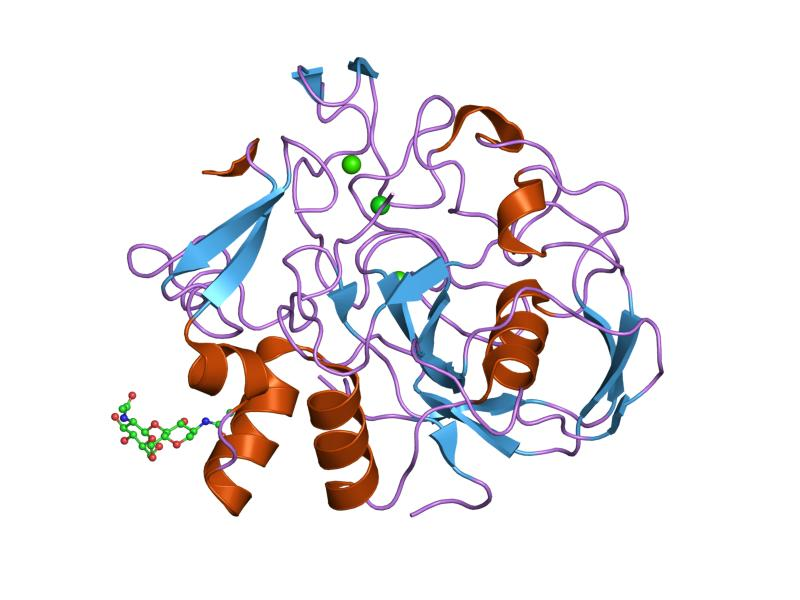
- formylglycine generating enzyme c336s mutant covalently bound to substrate peptide lctpsra

Identifiers
- Symbol: FGE-sulfatase
- Pfam: PF03781
- InterPro: IPR005532
Available protein structures:
- PDB: IPR005532 PF03781 (ECOD; PDBsum)
- AlphaFold: IPR005532; PF03781

Formylglycine-generating enzyme (FGE), located at 3p26.1 in humans, is the name for an enzyme present in the endoplasmic reticulum that catalyzes the conversion of cysteine to formylglycine (fGly). There are two main classes of FGE, aerobic and anaerobic. FGE activates sulfatases, which are essential for the degradation of sulfate esters. The catalytic activity of sulfatases is dependent upon a formylglycine (sometimes called oxoalanine) residue in the active site.

== Aerobic ==
The aerobic enzyme has a structure homologous to the complex alpha/beta topology found in the gene product of human sulfatase-modifying factor 1 (SUMF1). Aerobic FGE converts a cysteine residue in the highly conserved consensus sequence CXPXR to fGly. To do so, FGE "activates" its target by utilizing mononuclear copper. The substrate first binds to copper, increasing reactivity of the substrate-copper complex with oxygen. Activation is then accomplished through oxidation of a cysteine residue in the substrate-copper complex. Due to the nature of this reaction, FGE is termed a "copper-dependent metalloenzyme.

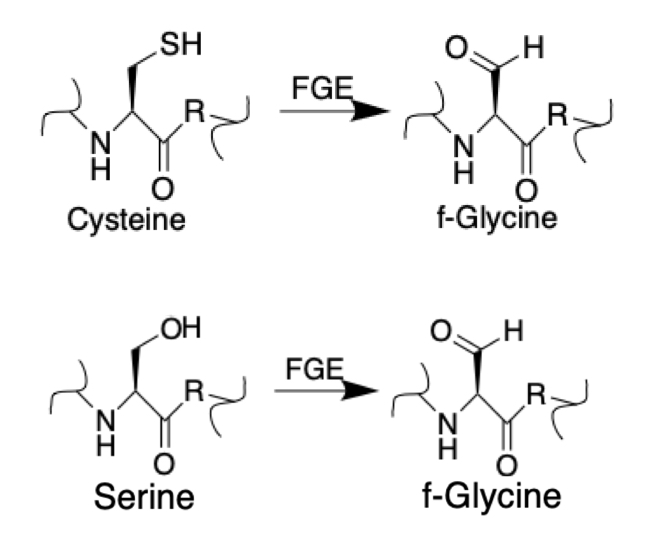
A brief overview of formylglycine-generating enzyme activity in aerobes (top only) and anaerobes (top and bottom).

== Anaerobic ==
The most well-studied anaerobic FGE is the bacterial AtsB, an iron-sulfur cluster containing enzyme present in Klebsiella pneumoniae, that is able to convert either cysteine or serine to fGly with a distinctly different mechanism than the aerobic form. While AtsB can convert either, its activity increases four fold when in the presence of cysteine over serine. AtsB is 48% similar to an enzyme present in Clostridium perfringens. Both enzymes possess the Cx_{3}Cx_{2}C motif unique to the radical S-adenosyl methionine superfamily and are able to use a reduction reaction to cleave S-adenosyl methionine. These two enzymes fall into a larger group called the anaerobic Sulfatase Maturing Enzymes, which are able to convert cysteine into fGly without the use of oxygen.

== Protein domain ==
In molecular biology, "formylglycine-generating enzyme" (sometimes annotated as formylglycine-generating sulfatase enzyme) is the name of the FGE protein domain, whether or not the protein is catalytically active. Both prokaryotic and eukaryotic homologs of FGE possess highly conserved active sites — including the catalytic cysteine residues required for enzymatic function. Activation of molecular oxygen is thought to be carried out by conserved residues close to the FGE catalytic site in aerobic organisms. The catalytic cysteine residues are involved in a thiol-cysteine exchange leading to the ultimate production of fGly.

== Disease states ==
In humans, mutations in SUMF1 result in defects in FGE, which in turn causes the impairment of sulfatases. The result is a disease called multiple sulfatase deficiency (MSD), in which the accumulation of glycosaminoglycans or sulfolipids can cause early infant death. This disease can be further differentiated into neonatal, late infantile, and juvenile, with neonatal being the most severe. Common symptoms include ichthyosis, hypotonia, skeletal abnormalities, and overall cognitive decline. In 2017 Weidner et al., found an association with SUMF1 expression and chronic obstructive pulmonary disease (COPD) development. As of January 2020, there were more than 100 reported cases worldwide of MSD. Known substrates for SUMF1 are: N-acetylgalactosamine-6-sulfate sulfatase (GALNS), arylsulfatase A (ARSA), steroid sulfatase (STS) and arylsulfatase L (ARSL); all molecules that contain cysteine. FGE converts this cysteine group into C-𝛼-formylglycine. SUMF1 occurs in the endoplasmic reticulum or its lumen.
