= Streptomyces griseorubiginosus =

Scientific classification
- Domain: Bacteria
- Kingdom: Bacillati
- Phylum: Actinomycetota
- Class: Actinomycetes
- Order: Streptomycetales
- Family: Streptomycetaceae
- Genus: Streptomyces
- Species: S. griseorubiginosus

Binomial name
- Streptomyces griseorubiginosus (Ryabova and Preobrazhenskaya 1957) Pridham et al. 1958 (Approved Lists 1980)

Type strain
- ATCC 23627, ATCC 25459, BCRC 12124, Bu 7,35, CBS 692.69, CCRC 12124, CGMCC 4.1766, DSM 40469, ETH 28438, IFO 13047, INA 7712, ISP 5469, JCM 4481, KCC S-0481, LMG 19941, NBRC 13047, NRRL B-12384, NRRL-ISP 5469, RIA 1239, VKM Ac-1203

Synonyms
- "Actinomyces griseorubiginosus" Ryabova and Preobrazhenskaya 1957; Streptomyces phaeopurpureus Shinobu 1957 (Approved Lists 1980); Streptomyces phaeoviridis Shinobu 1957 (Approved Lists 1980)

Species of bacterium

Streptomyces griseorubiginosus is a bacterium species from the genus of Streptomyces which has been isolated from soil in Russia. Streptomyces griseorubiginosus produces arylsulfatase, biphenomycin A, cinerubin A and cinerubin B.

== See also ==
- List of Streptomyces species
