= Bueso =

Bueso is a surname. Notable people with the surname include:

- David Bueso (born 1955), Honduran footballer
- Eduardo Bueso, Honduran politician
- Facundo Bueso Sanllehí (1905–1960), physicist, educator, science communicator and athlete
- Francisco Bueso (1860–?), Honduran politician
- Isabel Bueso (born 1994/1995), Guatemalan-born activist
- José Bueso Rosa, Honduran general and trafficker
- José Santiago Bueso (1815–1857), Honduran politician
- Orlando Bueso (born 1974), Honduran footballer
- Pol Bueso (born 1985), Spanish footballer
- Ricardo Bueso, Guatemalan businessman and politician
- Rosalinda Bueso (born 1977), Honduran diplomat
