= SUMF2 =

Protein-coding gene in the species Homo sapiens

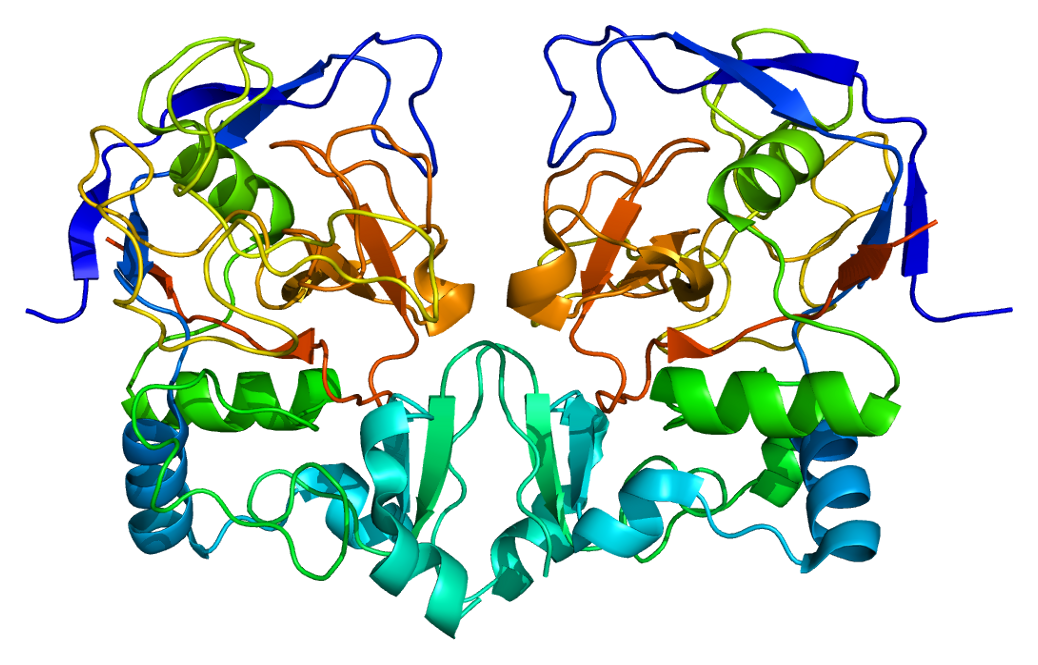

Identifiers
- Aliases: SUMF2, pFGE, sulfatase modifying factor 2
- External IDs: OMIM: 607940; MGI: 1915152; GeneCards: SUMF2
Available structures
PDB	Ortholog search: PDBe RCSB
PDB	List of PDB id codes 1Y4J

Gene location (Human)
Chr.	Chromosome 7 (human)
Band	7p11.2	Start	56,064,002 bp
Band	7p11.2	End	56,080,670 bp

Gene location (Mouse)
Chr.	Chromosome 5 (mouse)
Band	5|5 G1.3	Start	129,846,986 bp
Band	5|5 G1.3	End	129,864,050 bp
RNA expression pattern
Bgee	Human / Mouse (ortholog); Top expressed in: right uterine tube; stromal cell of endometrium; body of pancreas; gallbladder; canal of the cervix; islet of Langerhans; pancreatic ductal cell; right adrenal cortex; gastric mucosa; rectum / Top expressed in: hand; yolk sac; external carotid artery; internal carotid artery; renal corpuscle; cumulus cell; proximal tubule; neural tube; medullary collecting duct; condyle; More reference expression data
BioGPS	n/a
Gene ontology
Molecular function	metal ion binding
Cellular component	endoplasmic reticulum lumen; endoplasmic reticulum
Biological process	post-translational protein modification; glycosphingolipid metabolic process
Sources:Amigo / QuickGO
Orthologs
Databases	NCBI: entry; OMA: entry
Species	Human	Mouse
Entrez	25870	67902
Ensembl	ENSG00000129103	ENSMUSG00000025538
UniProt	Q8NBJ7	Q8BPG6
RefSeq (mRNA)	NM_001042468; NM_001042469; NM_001042470; NM_001130069; NM_001130070 NM_001146333; NM_015411; NM_001366647; NM_001366648; NM_001366649	NM_026445
RefSeq (protein)	NP_001035934; NP_001035935; NP_001123541; NP_001139805; NP_056226 NP_001035933; NP_001353576; NP_001353577; NP_001353578	NP_080721
Location (UCSC)	Chr 7: 56.06 – 56.08 Mb	Chr 5: 129.85 – 129.86 Mb
PubMed search
- Wikidata
View/Edit Human	View/Edit Mouse

Sulfatase-modifying factor 2 is an enzyme that in humans is encoded by the SUMF2 gene.

The catalytic sites of sulfatases are only active if they contain a unique amino acid, C-alpha-formylglycine (FGly). The FGly residue is posttranslationally generated from a cysteine by enzymes with FGly-generating activity. The gene described in this record is a member of the sulfatase-modifying factor family and encodes a protein with a DUF323 domain that localizes to the lumen of the endoplasmic reticulum. This protein has low levels of FGly-generating activity but can heterodimerize with another family member - a protein with high levels of FGly-generating activity. Alternate transcriptional splice variants, encoding different isoforms, have been characterized.
