= Ballabio (surname) =

Ballabio is an Italian surname. Notable people with the surname include:

- Andrea Ballabio (born 1957), Italian scientist and academic professor
- Erwin Ballabio (1918–2008), Swiss football goalkeeper
- Fulvio Ballabio (born 1954), race car driver
- Viviana Ballabio (born 1967), Italian basketball player

== See also ==
- Ballabio
