= Andrea Ballabio =

Italian scientist and academic professor

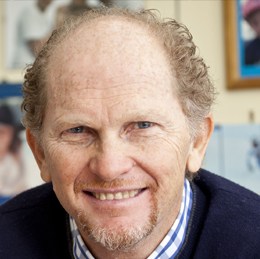
- Born: 27 January 1957; Naples
- Education: University of Naples Federico II, Naples, Italy
- Awards: Louis-Jeantet Prize for Medicine (2016)
- Scientific career
- Workplaces: Baylor College of Medicine, Houston, Texas; University of Naples Federico II, Naples, Italy

Andrea Ballabio (born in Naples, Italy, 27 January 1957) is an Italian scientist and academic professor. He is founder-director of the Telethon Institute of Genetics and Medicine (TIGEM), Naples, Italy; professor of medical genetics at the University of Naples Federico II, Naples, Italy and visiting professor of genetics at Baylor College of Medicine in Houston, Texas, U.S. and at the University of Oxford, UK. He is also the former director of the Telethon Institute of Genetics and Medicine in Milan, Italy. He is the recipient of 2016 Louis-Jeantet Prize for Medicine for his contribution to understanding the molecular mechanisms controlling the function of lysosomes in health and disease.

== Early life and education ==
After graduating in medicine and specializing in pediatrics at the Federico II University in Naples, he spent many years abroad, first in England and then in the United States, where he became associate professor at the Department of Molecular and Human Genetics, Baylor College of Medicine and co-director of Baylor Human Genome Center in Houston, Texas. In 1994 he returned to Italy, where he founded TIGEM, of which he is the scientific director. TIGEM is a research institute of excellence in Italy, with about 220 researchers from all over the world. Along with his team of researchers, he has identified genetic mutations responsible for many rare genetic diseases. His discovery of the TFEB gene, which controls the functioning of lysosomes, has had a major impact on cellular biology and neurodegenerative diseases.

== Career ==
At the beginning of his research career, he focused his attention on gene-disease identification including: the Kallmann syndrome gene (involved in axonal orientation), the OA1 gene (which deals withmelanosomes biogenesis and is mutated in ocular albinism), the paraplegine gene (which is involved in mitochondrial biology and mutated in hereditary spastic paraplegia), the MID1 gene (which is involved in the development of the median line and mutated in the OBB Opitz syndrome). He then focused on identifying the mechanisms underlying rare genetic diseases, particularly regarding lysosomal storage diseases (LSDs). In this context, he made the discovery of the Multiple sulfatase deficiency (MSD), in which all members of the sulphatase family (17 in humans) are deficient due to a defect in a post-translational modification. Using an innovative approach, he identified the SUMF1 (Modification Factor 1 sulphatase) gene, which is responsible for this post-translational modification and is mutated in MSD patients. It has also been shown that the overexpression of SUMF1 significantly increases the activity of exogenous sulphatase in both in vitro and in vivo models. This discovery had immediate clinical application: the SUMF1 gene is currently in use in the production of sulphatase as a tool to improve sulphatase activity for enzymatic replacement therapy.

Furthermore, among his major early discoveries, he identified and characterized the Xist gene in human and mice.

More recently he focused his attention on lysosomes, the organelles that are responsible for cellular waste degradation. Challenging the conventional knowledge of cellular biology, he hypothesized that lysosome is a dynamic structure subjected to global transcriptional regulation and able to adapt to environmental stimuli. Together with his team, he discovered that lysosomal, autophagy, and exocytotic biosynthesis are transcriptionally regulated by a gene network and controlled by the TFEB master gene, that promote cellular clearance. This mechanism has been tested in various disease models including: Parkinson's, Alzheimer's, Huntington's disease, lysosomal storage disorders, the α1-anti-trypsin deficiency and the bulbous spinal muscular atrophy. This discovery has opened up new possible therapeutic strategies based on the possibility of globally modulating lysosomal function by acting on TFEB gene network.

== Awards ==
He published 337 articles in international scientific journals (with an average Impact Factor of 9,128 per item) and contributed to 21 chapters of prestigious international books such as "Harrison's Principles of Internal Medicine" and "Molecular Bases of Inherited Disease". In total, his publications have been quoted more than 30,959 times. Over the last 10 years he has been invited as speaker to more than 100 international and national conferences. He has mentored many undergraduate and doctoral students. He is inventor of 7 international patents. He is a counselor at many committees of international bodies for evaluating research projects including the European Commission and the Canadian Genome Project. He is also a member of the editorial committees of numerous international scientific journals and major international scientific societies such as the European Molecular Biology Organization, the European Society of Human Genetics, the American Society of Human Genetics and many others.

Awards include:

- 1998, Member, European Molecular Biology Organization (EMBO)
- 1998, president of the European Society of Human Genetics.
- 2006, Torchbearer at the XX Torino 2006 Olympic Winter Games – Turin.
- 2007, Commander of the Order of Merit of Italy, Commendatore della Repubblica Italiana by President Giorgio Napolitano who also awarded him the silver medal for merit.
- 2010, 2016, and 2023, three-time winner of the European Research Council (ERC)'s Advanced Grant, which recognized the best European scientists.
- 2016, first in Italy to win the prestigious Louis-Jeantet Prize for Medicine for his contribution to understanding the molecular mechanisms controlling the function of lysosomes in health and disease.
