= Cerebroside-sulfatase =

Identifiers
- EC no.: 3.1.6.8
- CAS no.: 9068-68-2

Databases
- IntEnz: IntEnz view
- BRENDA: BRENDA entry
- ExPASy: NiceZyme view
- KEGG: KEGG entry
- MetaCyc: metabolic pathway
- PRIAM: profile
- PDB structures: RCSB PDB PDBe PDBsum
Search
- PMC: articles
- PubMed: articles
- NCBI: proteins

Cerebroside-sulfatase (EC 3.1.6.8, arylsulfatase A, cerebroside sulfate sulfatase) is an enzyme with systematic name cerebroside-3-sulfate 3-sulfohydrolase. This enzyme catalyses the following chemical reaction

a cerebroside 3-sulfate + H_{2}O $\rightleftharpoons$ a cerebroside + sulfate

This enzyme hydrolyses galactose-3-sulfate residues in a number of lipids.

== See also ==
- Arylsulfatase A
