= Arylsulfatase B =

Mammalian protein found in Homo sapiens

ARSB
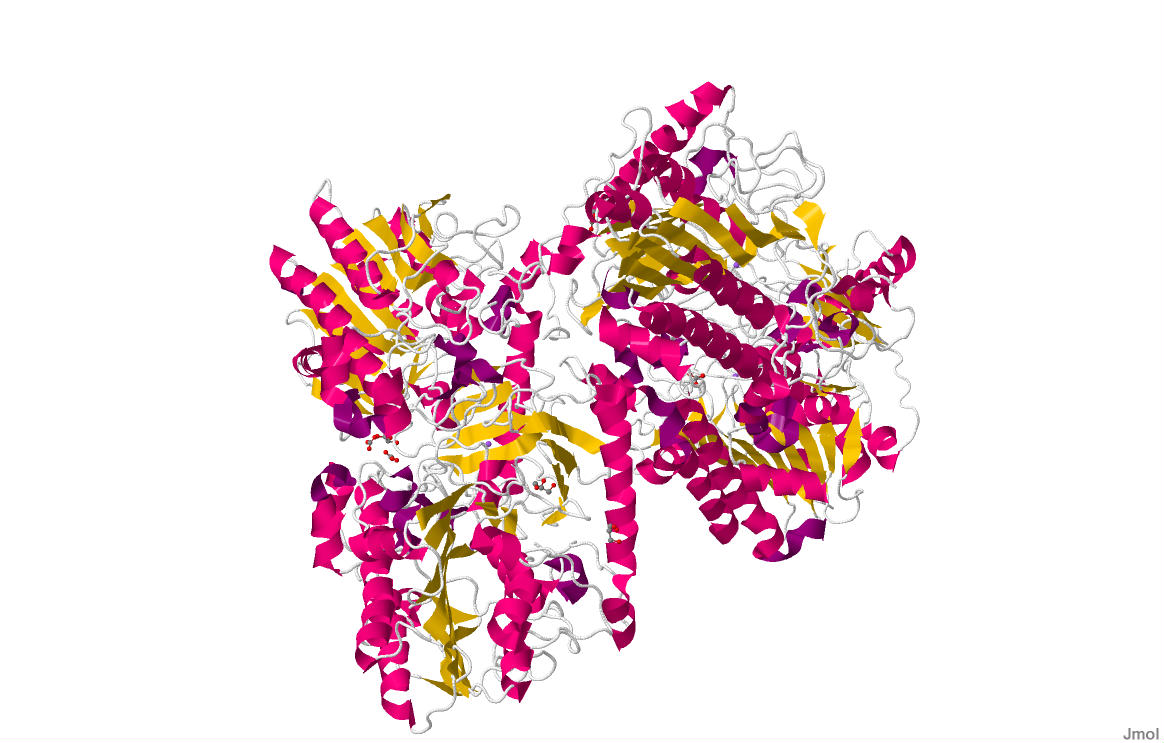

Identifiers
- Aliases: ARSB, arylsulfatase B, ASB, G4S, MPS6
- External IDs: OMIM: 611542; MGI: 88075; GeneCards: ARSB
Available structures
PDB	Ortholog search: PDBe RCSB
PDB	List of PDB id codes 1FSU
Enzyme activity
EC #	BRENDA	ExPASy	KEGG	MetaCyc
3.1.6.12	↗	↗	↗	↗

Gene location (Human)
Chr.	Chromosome 5 (human)
Band	5q14.1	Start	78,777,209 bp
Band	5q14.1	End	78,986,087 bp

Gene location (Mouse)
Chr.	Chromosome 13 (mouse)
Band	13 C3|13 47.88 cM	Start	93,908,138 bp
Band	13 C3|13 47.88 cM	End	94,079,524 bp
RNA expression pattern
Bgee	Human / Mouse (ortholog); Top expressed in: Achilles tendon; monocyte; stromal cell of endometrium; ventricular zone; gonad; tendon of biceps brachii; right coronary artery; thoracic aorta; ascending aorta; Descending thoracic aorta / Top expressed in: molar; body of femur; parotid gland; suprachiasmatic nucleus; median eminence; human kidney; right kidney; globus pallidus; piriform cortex; hippocampus proper; More reference expression data
BioGPS	n/a
Gene ontology
Molecular function	metal ion binding; arylsulfatase activity; catalytic activity; N-acetylgalactosamine-4-sulfatase activity; sulfuric ester hydrolase activity; hydrolase activity
Cellular component	rough endoplasmic reticulum; Golgi apparatus; endoplasmic reticulum lumen; cell surface; lysosomal lumen; mitochondrion; lysosome; extracellular exosome; extracellular region; azurophil granule lumen; ficolin-1-rich granule lumen
Biological process	glycosphingolipid metabolic process; response to nutrient; post-translational protein modification; response to estrogen; autophagy; regulation of epithelial cell migration; central nervous system development; colon epithelial cell migration; positive regulation of neuron projection development; response to pH; chondroitin sulfate catabolic process; lysosomal transport; metabolism; response to methylmercury; lysosome organization; neutrophil degranulation
Sources:Amigo / QuickGO
Orthologs
Databases	NCBI: entry; OMA: entry
Species	Human	Mouse
Entrez	411	11881
Ensembl	ENSG00000113273	ENSMUSG00000042082
UniProt	P15848	P50429
RefSeq (mRNA)	NM_000046; NM_198709	NM_009712
RefSeq (protein)	NP_000037; NP_942002	NP_033842
Location (UCSC)	Chr 5: 78.78 – 78.99 Mb	Chr 13: 93.91 – 94.08 Mb
PubMed search
- Wikidata
View/Edit Human	View/Edit Mouse

arylsulfatase B
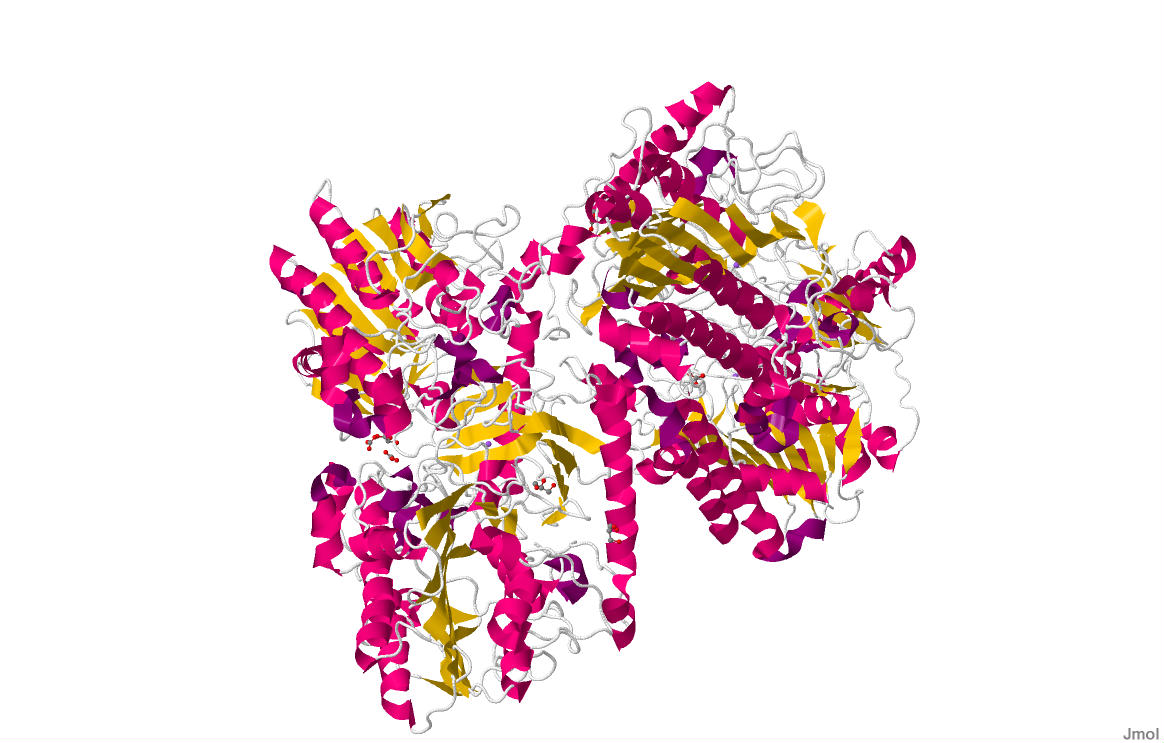
- Crystallographic structure of putative tetrameric arylsulfatase from Escherichia coli.

Identifiers
- Symbol: ARSB
- NCBI gene: 411
- HGNC: 714
- OMIM: 253200
- RefSeq: NM_000046
- UniProt: P15848

Other data
- EC number: 3.1.6.12
- Locus: Chr. 5 p11-q13
Search for
- Structures: Swiss-model
- Domains: InterPro

Galsulfase INN: galsulfase
Clinical data
- Trade names: Naglazyme
- Other names: Aryplase
- AHFS/Drugs.com: Professional Drug Facts
- License data: US DailyMed: Galsulfase
- Pregnancy category: AU: B3
- Routes of administration: Intravenous
- ATC code: A16AB08 (WHO)

Legal status
- Legal status: US: ℞-only; EU: Rx-only; In general: ℞ (Prescription only)

Identifiers
- CAS Number: 552858-79-4
- DrugBank: DB01279
- UNII: 59UA429E5G
- KEGG: D06565
- ChEMBL: ChEMBL1201822

Chemical and physical data
- Formula: C_{2529}H_{3843}N_{689}O_{716}S_{16}
- Molar mass: 55868.63 g·mol^{−1}

Arylsulfatase B (N-acetylgalactosamine-4-sulfatase, chondroitinsulfatase, chondroitinase, acetylgalactosamine 4-sulfatase, N-acetylgalactosamine 4-sulfate sulfohydrolase, EC 3.1.6.12) is an enzyme associated with mucopolysaccharidosis VI (Maroteaux–Lamy syndrome).

Arylsulfatase B is among a group of arylsulfatase enzymes present in the lysosomes of the liver, pancreas, and kidneys of animals. The purpose of the enzyme is to hydrolyze sulfates in the body. ARSB does this by breaking down glycosaminoglycans (GAGs), which are large sugar molecules in the body. ARSB targets two GAGs in particular: dermatan sulfate and chondroitin sulfate.

Over 130 mutations to ARSB have been found, each leading to a deficiency in the body. In most cases, the mutation occurs on a single nucleotide in the sequence. An arylsulfatase B deficiency can lead to an accumulation of GAGs in lysosomes, which in turn can lead to mucopolysaccharidosis VI.

Used as a pharmaceutical drug, the enzyme is known under the International Nonproprietary Name galsulfase and is sold under the brand name Naglazyme. Galsulfase was approved for medical use in the United States in May 2005 and in European Union in January 2006. Galsulfase is indicated for long-term enzyme-replacement therapy in people with a confirmed diagnosis of mucopolysaccharidosis VI (MPS VI; N-acetylgalactosamine-4-sulfatase deficiency; Maroteaux-Lamy syndrome).

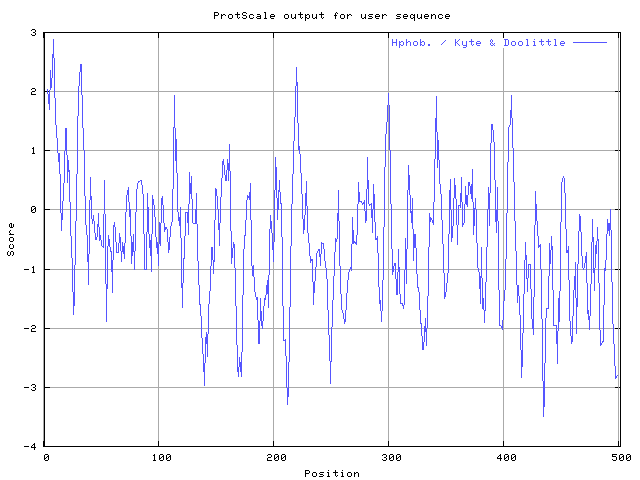
Kyte-Doolittle hydropathy plot: enlarge for better viewing

== Structure ==
The primary structure of Escherichia coli arylsulfatase B contains a primary sequence of 502 amino acids. Its secondary structure is quite complex, containing numerous alpha helices (20 total containing 138 residues) and beta sheets (21 strands total containing 87 residues). The functional enzyme is believed to be a homo tetramer. Due to the complexity of arylsulfatase B's secondary structure, many hydrophobic and hydrophilic regions are present, as demonstrated by the Kyte-Doolittle hydropathy plot:

== Medical uses ==
Galsulfase is used to treat adults and children who have mucopolysaccharidosis VI (MPS VI or Maroteaux-Lamy syndrome). This disease is caused by the lack of an enzyme called N-acetylgalactosamine 4-sulfatase, which is needed to break down substances in the body called glycosaminoglycans (GAGs). If the enzyme is not present, GAGs cannot be broken down and they build up in the cells. This causes the signs of the disease, the most noticeable being a short body, a large head and difficulty moving about. The disease is usually diagnosed in infants between one and five years of age. Galsulfase has been shown to improve walking and stair-climbing capacity.

The most common adverse reactions (≥10%) are: rash, pain, urticaria, pyrexia, pruritus, chills, headache, nausea, vomiting, abdominal pain and dyspnea. The most common adverse reactions requiring interventions are infusion-related reactions.

Galsulfase (N-acetylgalactosamine-4-sulfatase, recombinant human) was granted orphan drug designation by both the European Commission and the U.S. Food and Drug Administration (FDA).

== Role in cystic fibrosis ==
Expression and activity of ARSB were found to be related to the function of cystic fibrosis transmembrane conductance regulator (CFTR), the membrane channel deficient in cystic fibrosis. Measurements in cystic fibrosis cell line IB3 and its derivative cell line C38, which has a functional CFTR, showed increased ARSB activity and expression in the C38 line. CFTR potentiator VRT-532 increased ARSB expression and activity in cystic fibrosis cells to the level in the normal bronchial epithelial cells.

== Role in malignancy ==
ARSB has been studied in a variety of cancers. Cultured normal mammary epithelial and myoepithelial cells had significantly higher ARSB activity than cultured malignant mammary cells. Immunohistochemistry in the colon showed decreased membrane ARSB staining in colon cancer compared to normal colon, as well as in higher grade malignancies. ARSB activity was lower in malignant than normal prostate tissue, and immunostaining of prostate tissue microarrays showed not only decreasing ARSB staining in prostate cancer tissue of a higher Gleason score, but also lower staining in patients with recurrent compared to non-recurrent cancer. ARSB staining was a greater predictor of recurrence than Prostate-specific antigen (PSA) test, indicating possible future role of ARSB as a prognostic biomarker of prostate cancer. Further evidence of ARSB as a tumor suppressor was determined by molecular studies in cell cultures where ARSB was silenced by siRNA. The studies showed that decrease of ARSB leads to increase in free galectin-3, which attaches more strongly to less sulfated chondroitin 4-sulfate. Galectin-3 then acts on transcription factors AP-1 to increase expression of chondroitin sulfate proteoglycan versican and SP-1 to increase expression of WNT9A. Another mechanism by which reduced ARSB is associated with carcinogenesis is through increased binding of SHP2 to more sulfated chondroitin 4-sulfate, which leads to increased phosphorylation of p38 and MITF with subsequently increased expression of GPNMB.

== Role in metabolism ==
Reduced sulfate availability due to impaired activity of ARSB has been linked to increased aerobic glycolysis, as shown by an increase in NADH and NADPH, reduced oxygen consumption, increased extracellular acidification and serum lactate, and a decline in mitochondrial membrane potential in ARSB-silenced cells and ARSB-null mouse tissues.

== Extra-lysosomal localization ==
Although primarily a lysosomal enzyme, ARSB was also found to localize at the cell membrane of hepatocytes, sinusoidal endothelial cells, and Kupffer cells in the liver, as well as in the apical membranes of normal and malignant colonic and prostatic epithelial cells, by immunohistochemistry and immunofluorescence studies. Membrane immunostaining in the colon and prostate was lower in malignant than in normal tissue and also was lower in higher grade malignancies. ARSB activity assay in the membrane and cytosol fractions of cultured bronchial epithelial cells showed that the activity was several-fold greater in the membrane fraction.

== See also ==
- Aryl
- Sulfatase
