= Luis Morquio =

Uruguayan physician and professor

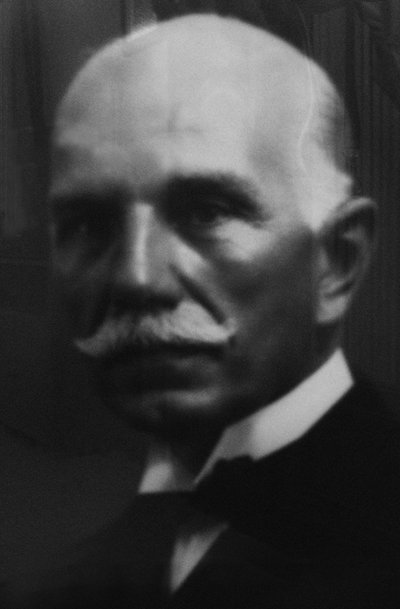
- Born: September 24, 1867; Montevideo, Uruguay
- Died: June 19, 1935 (aged 67)
- Education: University of the Republic
- Medical career
- Field: Pediatrics, pathology

Luis Morquio (September 24, 1867 – June 19, 1935) was a Uruguayan physician and professor. A medical condition, Morquio syndrome (mucopolysaccharidosis IV), is named in his honor.

== Biography ==
Morquio was born on September 24, 1867, in Montevideo, Uruguay. He grew up in Montevideo and earned a medical degree from the University of the Republic in 1892. He continued his studies in Paris for two years, specializing in pathology. Upon his return to Montevideo, he became the director of an orphanage in 1894. For 40 years, Morquio worked to move away from Uruguay's system of anonymous abandonment of children, helping mothers with alternatives to abandoning their children and helping to preserve the link between mothers and children.

In 1900 he became a professor of pediatrics and was promoted to chair of the department. He led the department with distinction for 35 years. Several authors highlight Morquio's work at the Charity Clinic. He felt that babies should be fed their mother's milk, or in the alternative, that cow's milk should be sterilized.

In 1915, Morquio proposed the creation of the Pediatric Society of Montevideo (today known as the Uruguayan Pediatric Society). The organization grew under his guidance. During the Second American Congress of the Child in Montevideo in 1919, he proposed the creation of the International Office of Child Protection, which was unanimously approved. In 1927, he voluntarily resigned from the presidency of the Uruguay Pediatric Society, and the group decided to name him honorary president.

Morquio authored 335 scientific publications in national and international journals over a 44-year career. A medical condition known as mucopolysaccharidosis type IV, which he described, was named Morquio syndrome in his honor.

In 1935, Morquio died suddenly, and he was memorialized with a bust at the Institute of Paediatrics in Montevideo.

== Bibliography ==
- Herrera Ramos, Fernando; Gorlero Bacigalupi, Rubén. Luis Morquio (1867–1935) (PDF) (in Spanish) – via Sindicato Médico del Uruguay.
- Belmont Parker, William, ed. (1921). Uruguayans of today. London: The Hispanic Society of America. OCLC 1460239.
