= James Frederick Brailsford =

British radiologist

James Frederick Brailsford (8 July 1888 – 28 January 1961) was a British radiologist, known as the founder and first president of the British Association of Radiologists and as the co-discoverer of the Morquio (or Morquio-Brailsford) syndrome.

Brailsford had known hardship in his student days. His parents, ‘just honest, simple folk’, could not afford him a higher education. It was his work as a technician in the public health department of Birmingham, for which he had trained the hard way in technical schools and evening classes, which attracted the attention of his chief. Sir John Robertson encouraged him to enter the Birmingham Medical School in 1918 when he was already aged thirty and had given distinguished service for four years as an army radiographer in the First World War.

He studied with Sir John Robertson, the Medical Officer of Health of Birmingham. In 1923 Brailsford qualified MB, ChB (Birmingham) and was appointed assistant radiologist to Queen's Hospital, Birmingham. In 1928 he received the higher qualification MD (Birmingham). As a radiologist and a demonstrator in living anatomy, he published 1934 his famous textbook The Radiology of Joints and Bones and thereby was acknowledged as one of the world's authorities on skeletal diseases. He received Ph.D. Birmingham (1936) and became MRCS, LRCP (1923), MRCP (1935), and FRCP (1941).

== Awards and honours ==
- 1927 — Robert Jones gold medal of the British Orthopaedic Association
- 1931 — Roentgen Prize of the British Institute of Radiology
- 1934–1935 — Hunterian Professor of the Royal College of Surgeons of England
- 1944 — Mackenzie Davidson Lecturer
- 1943–1945 — Hunterian Professor of the Royal College of Surgeons of England
