= Morquio syndrome =

- Other names: Mucopolysaccharidosis IV, MPS IV, Morquio-Brailsford syndrome, or Morquio
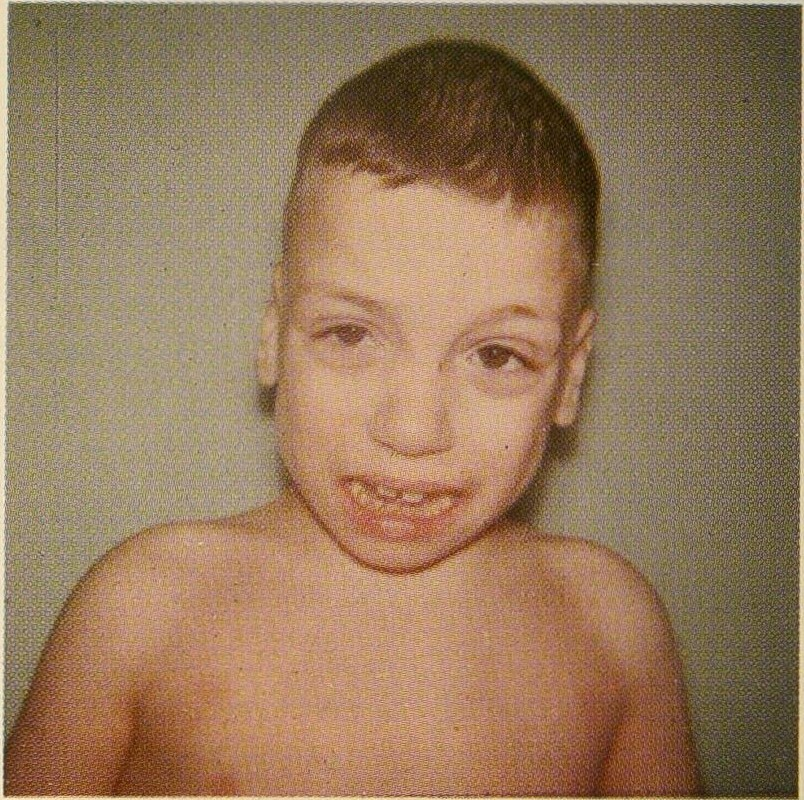
- Patient with Morquio syndrome
- Specialty: Endocrinology
- Complications: Skeletal abnormalities, hearing loss, pulmonary failure, heart disease
- Usual onset: Birth; condition usually becomes apparent between ages 1 and 3
- Duration: Lifelong
- Types: Type A and Type B
- Causes: Inherited deficiency of enzymes
- Treatment: Elosulfase alfa (Vimizim) for Type A; no approved treatment for Type B
- Prognosis: Reduced lifespan. Usually death occurs in 20s to 30s
- Frequency: 1 in 200,000 to 1 in 300,000

Morquio syndrome, also known as mucopolysaccharidosis type IV (MPS IV), is a rare metabolic disorder in which the body cannot process certain types of sugar molecules called glycosaminoglycans (GAGs). In Morquio syndrome, the specific GAG which builds up in the body is called keratan sulfate. This birth defect, which is autosomal recessive, is a type of lysosomal storage disorder. The buildup of GAGs in different parts of the body causes symptoms in many different organ systems. In the US, the incidence rate for Morquio syndrome is estimated at between 1 in 200,000 and 1 in 300,000 live births.

== Signs and symptoms ==
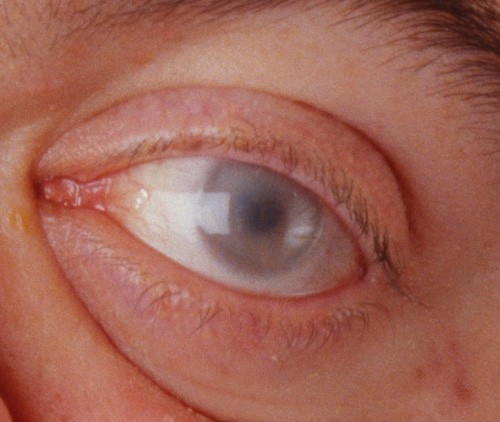
Corneal clouding in a 30-year-old male with MPS VI. Morquio syndrome and other MPS disorders may also present with corneal clouding.

Patients with Morquio syndrome appear healthy at birth. Types A and B have similar presentations, but Type B generally has milder symptoms. The age of onset is usually between 1 and 3 years of age. Morquio syndrome causes progressive skeletal changes to the ribs and chest, which may lead to neurological complications such as nerve compression. Patients may also have hearing loss and clouded corneas. Intelligence is usually normal unless a patient has untreated hydrocephalus.

Physical growth slows and often stops around age 8. Skeletal abnormalities include a bell-shaped chest, widely spaced teeth with thin enamel, a flattening or curvature of the spine, shortened long bones, and dysplasia of the hips, knees, ankles, and wrists. The bones that stabilize the connection between the head and neck can be malformed (odontoid hypoplasia); in these cases, a surgical procedure called spinal cervical bone fusion can be lifesaving. These bone abnormalities often lead to abnormalities in gait and a tendency to fall. Restricted breathing, joint stiffness, and heart disease are also common. Children with the more severe form of MPS IV may not live beyond their twenties or thirties.

Some additional signs and symptoms of Morquio syndrome include a short stature, scoliosis, kyphosis, hypermobile joints, knock-knees, pectus carinatum, misshapen limbs, unstable vertebrae, cord compression, hepatomegaly, hearing problems, vision problems, and heart problems.

== Cause ==
Morquio syndrome is inherited from an autosomal recessive inherited gene. Every person has two copies of the genes needed to break down keratan sulfate, but only one healthy copy is needed. Both parents pass down one defective copy to their child, resulting in a child with no functional copies of the gene. As such, the body is incapable of breaking down keratan sulfate for disposal. The incompletely broken down GAGs remain stored in cells in the body, causing progressive damage. Babies may show little sign of the disease, but as more and more cells become damaged, symptoms start to appear.

== Diagnosis ==
=== Classification ===
This syndrome has two forms, A and B, referred to as Morquio A and Morquio B syndrome or MPS IVA and MPS IVB. The two forms are distinguished by the gene product involved; Type A involves a malfunction in the GALNS gene, while Type B involves a malfunction of the GLB1 gene.

Genetics of MPS IV
Morquio syndrome type	Gene	Missing enzyme	Chromosomal region
Type A	GALNS	Galactosamine-6 sulfatase	16q24
Type B	GLB1	Beta-galactosidase	3p22

== Treatment ==
The treatment for Morquio syndrome consists of prenatal identification and of enzyme replacement therapy. On February, 14 2014, the US Food and Drug Administration approved the drug elosulfase alfa (Vimizim) for treating Type A. Currently, there is no treatment for Type B.

== Prognosis ==
The lifespan of patients with Morquio syndrome is variable and depends on the subtype. Type A is generally severe, with a life expectancy in the 20s to 30s. In 2016, a man with Morquio syndrome died at the age of 81.

One study found that the mean life expectancy for patients in the United Kingdom was 25.30, with a standard deviation of 17.43 years. On average, female patients lived 4 years longer than male patients. Respiratory failure was the primary cause of death in 63% of patients. Other causes of death were cardiac failure (11%), post-traumatic organ failure (11%), complications of surgery (11%), and heart attack (4%). Life expectancy has been increasing since the 1980s. The average age at death due to respiratory failure improved from 17.42 years old in the 1980s to 30.74 years old in the 2000s.

== History ==
The condition was first described, simultaneously and independently, in 1929, by Luis Morquio (1867–1935), a prominent Uruguayan physician who discovered it in Montevideo, and James Frederick Brailsford (1888–1961), an English radiologist in Birmingham, England. They both recognized the occurrence of corneal clouding, aortic valve disease, and urinary excretion of keratan sulfate. Morquio observed the disorder in four siblings in a family of Swedish descent and reported his observations in French.

== See also ==
- Hurler syndrome (MPS I)
- Hunter syndrome (MPS II)
- Sanfilippo syndrome (MPS III)
- Dwarfism
