= WNT9A =

Protein-coding gene in humans

Identifiers
- Aliases: WNT9A, WNT14, Wnt family member 9A
- External IDs: OMIM: 602863; MGI: 2446084; GeneCards: WNT9A

Gene location (Human)
Chr.	Chromosome 1 (human)
Band	1q42.13	Start	227,918,656 bp
Band	1q42.13	End	227,947,932 bp

Gene location (Mouse)
Chr.	Chromosome 11 (mouse)
Band	11|11 B1.3	Start	59,197,754 bp
Band	11|11 B1.3	End	59,224,378 bp
RNA expression pattern
Bgee	Human / Mouse (ortholog); Top expressed in: decidua; oocyte; gastrocnemius muscle; muscle of thigh; tendon of biceps brachii; parotid gland; muscle layer of sigmoid colon; secondary oocyte; tibialis anterior muscle; mucosa of paranasal sinus / Top expressed in: urethra; lumbar spinal ganglion; ramus of the mandible; lamina propria of urethra; prostatic urethra; muscle layer of urethra; muscle layer of seminal vesicle; muscular layer of prostatic urethra; tibialis anterior muscle; triceps brachii muscle; More reference expression data
BioGPS	n/a
Gene ontology
Molecular function	frizzled binding; signaling receptor binding; receptor ligand activity
Cellular component	extracellular region; extracellular space
Biological process	embryonic skeletal system morphogenesis; cellular response to retinoic acid; cell fate commitment; negative regulation of cysteine-type endopeptidase activity involved in apoptotic process; negative regulation of cartilage development; embryonic skeletal joint development; positive regulation of smoothened signaling pathway; anatomical structure development; mitotic cell cycle checkpoint signaling; iris morphogenesis; cornea development in camera-type eye; cell-cell signaling; negative regulation of cell death; multicellular organism development; negative regulation of chondrocyte differentiation; positive regulation of cell differentiation; neuron differentiation; embryonic forelimb morphogenesis; negative regulation of cell population proliferation; Wnt signaling pathway; regulation of signaling receptor activity; canonical Wnt signaling pathway
Sources:Amigo / QuickGO
Orthologs
Databases	NCBI: entry; OMA: entry
Species	Human	Mouse
Entrez	7483	216795
Ensembl	ENSG00000143816	ENSMUSG00000000126
UniProt	O14904	Q8R5M2
RefSeq (mRNA)	NM_003395	NM_139298
RefSeq (protein)	NP_003386	NP_647459
Location (UCSC)	Chr 1: 227.92 – 227.95 Mb	Chr 11: 59.2 – 59.22 Mb
PubMed search
- Wikidata
View/Edit Human	View/Edit Mouse

Protein Wnt-9a (formerly Wnt14) is a protein that in humans is encoded by the WNT9A gene.

The WNT gene family consists of structurally related genes that encode secreted signaling proteins. These proteins have been implicated in oncogenesis and in several developmental processes, including regulation of cell fate and patterning during embryogenesis. This gene is a member of the WNT gene family. It is expressed in gastric cancer cell lines. The protein encoded by this gene shows 75% amino acid identity to chicken Wnt14, which has been shown to play a central role in initiating synovial joint formation in the chick limb. This gene is clustered with another family member, WNT3A, in the chromosome 1q42 region.
