= Isabel Bueso =

Guatemalan-born activist

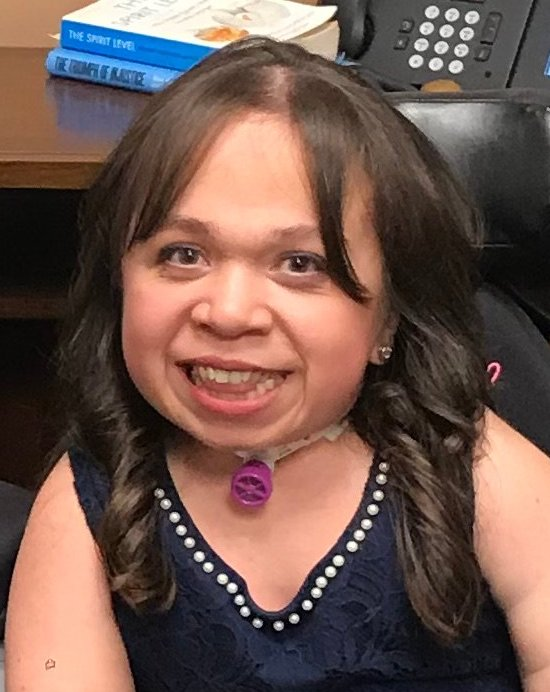
- Born: Maria Isabel Bueso Barrera; 1994 or 1995 (age 30–31)
- Citizenship: Guatemala
- Occupation: Activist

Maria Isabel Bueso Barrera (born 1994/1995) is a Guatemalan-born activist with Maroteaux-Lamy syndrome living in the United States under deferred action.

== Background ==
Bueso was born in Guatemala. She was diagnosed with Maroteaux-Lamy syndrome, or MPS VI, when she was one and a half. In 2003, when she was seven years old, she and her family moved to the Bay Area so that Bueso could participate in a clinical research trial for a treatment for Mucopolysaccharidosis Type 6, also known as MPS VI or Maroteaux-Lamy Syndrome at UCSF Benioff Children's Hospital. That treatment successfully obtained FDA approval, and Bueso continued to participate in follow-up studies.

In 2018, she graduated from California State University East Bay, where she had majored in sociology and had been involved in disability advocacy.

== Threat to deferred action status ==
Because of deferred action, Bueso and her family were allowed to stay in the United States so that she could continue getting lifesaving treatment at UCSF Benioff Children's Hospital. When the Trump administration rescinded that program in August 2019, Bueso and her family were told they had 33 days to leave the country and return to Guatemala, even though the treatment Bueso requires is not available there. UCSF Benioff staff held a rally in support of Bueso, and Congressman Mark DeSaulnier introduced a private bill that would give Bueso and her family immigrant visas. Bueso testified about her situation at a House Committee on Oversight and Reform hearing. After public outcry, U.S. Citizenship and Immigration Services reversed the decision and said they would continue to review deferred action requests on a case-by-case basis.

In December 2019, immigration officials granted Bueso deferred action for two more years. In December 2022, her status was adjusted to allow her to become a permanent resident.
