= Arylsulfatase L =

Protein-coding gene in the species Homo sapiens

ARSL

Identifiers
- Aliases: ARSL, ASE, CDPX, CDPX1, CDPXR, arylsulfatase E (chondrodysplasia punctata 1), arylsulfatase E, arylsulfatase L, ARSE
- External IDs: OMIM: 300180; GeneCards: ARSL
Enzyme activity
EC #	BRENDA	ExPASy	KEGG	MetaCyc
3.1.6.1	↗	↗	↗	↗

Gene location (Human)
Chr.	X chromosome (human)
Band	Xp22.33	Start	2,934,045 bp
Band	Xp22.33	End	2,968,475 bp
RNA expression pattern
Bgee	Human / Mouse (ortholog); Top expressed in: body of pancreas; liver; right lobe of liver; gonad; mucosa of transverse colon; human kidney; rectum; islet of Langerhans; mucosa of sigmoid colon; mucosa of ileum / n/a; More reference expression data
BioGPS	n/a
Gene ontology
Molecular function	sulfuric ester hydrolase activity; catalytic activity; hydrolase activity; arylsulfatase activity; metal ion binding
Cellular component	Golgi stack; endoplasmic reticulum lumen; extracellular exosome; Golgi apparatus; membrane; integral component of membrane
Biological process	post-translational protein modification; skeletal system development; metabolism; glycosphingolipid metabolic process
Sources:Amigo / QuickGO
Orthologs
Databases	NCBI: entry; OMA: entry
Species	Human	Mouse
Entrez	415	n/a
Ensembl	ENSG00000157399	n/a
UniProt	P51690	n/a
RefSeq (mRNA)	NM_000047; NM_001282628; NM_001282631; NM_001369079; NM_001369080	n/a
RefSeq (protein)	NP_000038; NP_001269557; NP_001269560; NP_001356008; NP_001356009 NP_001269557.1; NP_001269560.1	n/a
Location (UCSC)	Chr X: 2.93 – 2.97 Mb	n/a
PubMed search		n/a
- Wikidata
View/Edit Human

Arylsulfatase L is an enzyme that, in humans, is encoded by the ARSL gene.

== Function ==
Arylsulfatase L is a member of the arylsulfatase subfamily of sulfatase enzymes that catalyze the hydrolysis of sulfate esters. It is glycosylated postranslationally and localized to the golgi apparatus. Sulfatases are essential for the correct composition of bone and cartilage matrix.

== Clinical significance ==
Deficiencies in ARSL are associated with X-linked recessive chondrodysplasia punctata, a disease characterized by abnormalities in cartilage and bone development.
