= Arylsulfatase =

Class of enzymes

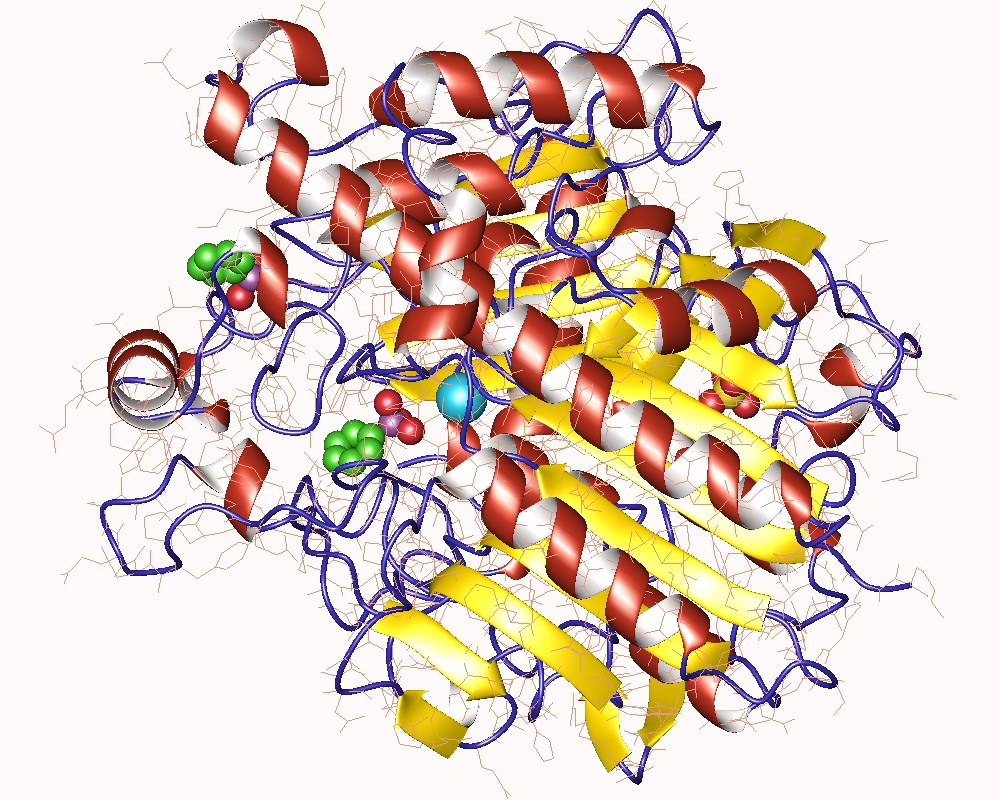
- Arylsulfatase monomer, Pseudomonas aeruginosa

Identifiers
- EC no.: 3.1.6.1
- CAS no.: 9016-17-5

Databases
- BRENDA: enzyme data
- ExPASy: NiceZyme view
- KEGG: enzyme entry
- MetaCyc: metabolic pathway
- Rhea: reactions
- PDB structures: RCSB PDB PDBe PDBsum
Search
- PMC: articles
- PubMed: articles
- NCBI: proteins

Arylsulfatase (EC 3.1.6.1, sulfatase, nitrocatechol sulfatase, phenolsulfatase, phenylsulfatase, p-nitrophenyl sulfatase, arylsulfohydrolase, 4-methylumbelliferyl sulfatase, estrogen sulfatase) is a type of sulfatase enzyme with systematic name aryl-sulfate sulfohydrolase. This enzyme catalyses the following chemical reaction

an aryl sulfate + H_{2}O $\rightleftharpoons$ a phenol + sulfate

It catalyses an analogous reaction for sulfonated hexoses. Types include:

- Arylsulfatase A (also known as "cerebroside-sulfatase")
- Arylsulfatase B (also known as "N-acetylgalactosamine-4-sulfatase")
- Steroid sulfatase (formerly known as "arylsulfatase C")
- ARSC2
- ARSD
- ARSF
- ARSG
- ARSH
- ARSI
- ARSJ
- ARSK
- ARSL (formerly known as "arylsulfatase E", "ARSE")

All arylsufatases require a post-translational modification in which a conserved cysteine or serine residue is converted to a formygylcine (FGly) residue by the formyglycine-generating enzyme. Without this modification the enzyme is completely catalytically inactive, a fact demonstrated in multiple sulfatase deficiency, a disorder in which this modification fail across all sulfatases simultaneously. The crystal structure of human arylsulfase A was resolved at 2.1 angstrom resolution and revealed the enzymes forms a homooctamer arranged as a tetramer of dimers. The active site contains a positively charged pocket coordinated by a magnesium ion, with key residues Lys123, Lys302, His229 and Ser150 facilitating sulfate binding. During Catalysis the formyglycine residue acts as a nucleophile attacking the sulfur atom of the substrate, releasing inorganic sulfate and the desulfated product. Arylsulfatases are widely distributed among mammals, microorganisms, and green algae, but have not been identified in higher plants. In soil bacterial, arylsulfatase activity plays an important role in the sulfur cycle by mobilizing sulfate from organic compounds, making it available for uptake by other organisms. Deficiency of ARSA results in metachromatic leukodystrophy by progressive neurological deterioration. ARSA enzyme activity levels measured in leukocytes or cultured fibroblasts can be used to predict disease severity and clinical phenotype in affected individuals. Enzyme replacement therapy has been investigated as a treatment strategy for both metachromatic leukodystrophy and Maroteaux-Lamy syndrome caused by ARSB deficiency.

== See also ==
- Aryl
