= Multiple sulfatase deficiency =

- Other names: Juvenile sulfatidosis, Austin type
- Multiple sulfatase deficiency is autorecessive
- Specialty: Endocrinology

Multiple sulfatase deficiency (MSD), also known as Austin disease, or mucosulfatidosis, is a very rare autosomal recessive lysosomal storage disease caused by a deficiency in multiple sulfatase enzymes, or in formylglycine-generating enzyme, which activates sulfatases. It is similar to mucopolysaccharidosis.

== Signs and symptoms ==
Signs and symptoms of this disorder commonly appear between one and two years of age. Signs include mildly coarsened facial features, deafness, ichthyosis and an enlarged liver and spleen (hepatosplenomegaly). Abnormalities of the skeleton, such as a curving of the spine and breast bone may occur. Individuals afflicted with this disorder typically have dry skin. Children affected by this disorder develop more slowly than normal and may display delayed speech and walking skills.

The disease is fatal, with symptoms that include neurological damage and severe intellectual disability. These sulfatase enzymes are responsible for breaking down and recycling complex sulfate-containing sugars from lipids and mucopolysaccharides within the lysosome. The accumulation of lipids and mucopolysaccharides inside the lysosome results in symptoms associated with this disorder. As of 2018, 75–100 cases of MSD had been reported worldwide.

== Causes ==
Multiple sulfatase deficiency is caused by any mutation of the SUMF1 gene which renders its protein product, the formylglycine-generating enzyme (FGE), defective. These mutations result in inactive forms of FGE. This enzyme is required for posttranslational modification of a cysteine residue in the sulfatase enzyme active site into formylglycine, which is required for its proper function.

== Genetics ==
MSD has an autosomal recessive inheritance pattern. The inheritance probabilities per birth are as follows:

- If both parents are carriers:
  - 25% (1 in 4) of children will have the disorder
  - 50% (2 in 4) of children will be carriers (but unaffected)
  - 25% (1 in 4) of children will be free of MSD - unaffected child that is not a carrier
- If one parent is affected and one is free of MSD:
  - 0% (0) children will have the disorder - only one parent is affected, other parent always gives normal gene
  - 100% (4 in 4) children will be carriers (but unaffected)
- If one parent is a carrier and the other is free of MSD:
  - 50% (2 in 4) children will be carriers (but unaffected)
  - 50% (2 in 4) children will be free of MSD - unaffected child that is not a carrier

== Diagnosis ==
MSD may be diagnosed when deficiency of more than one sulfatase enzyme is identified in leukocytes or fibroblasts, or by molecular genetic testing which shows pathogenic variation in both alleles of the SUMF1 gene.

== Treatment ==
As there is no cure for MSD, treatment is restricted to the management of symptoms. There is much research on MSD that is currently underway. MSD Action Foundation has initiated more than 15 research projects on MSD in the last 6 years. Many of these have a translational focus. It is hoped that clinical trials for MSD will happen in the not-too-distant future- Alan Finglas. [Ref 17. Finglas 2020]

== See also ==
- Linear porokeratosis
- List of cutaneous conditions
