= SUMF1 =

Protein-coding gene in the species Homo sapiens

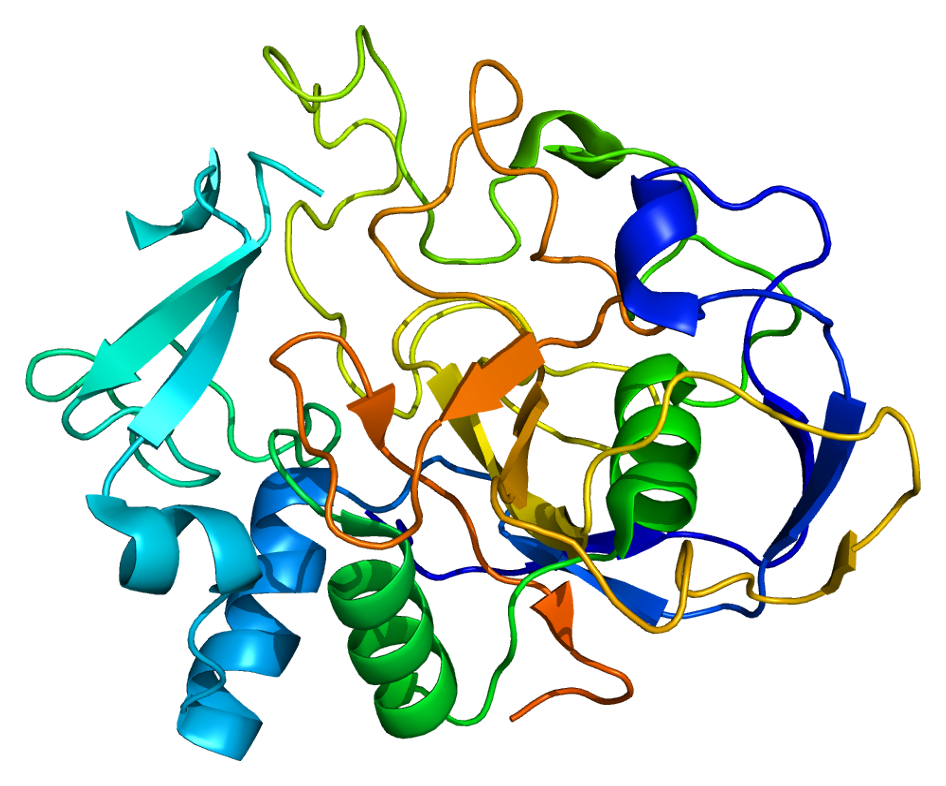
Available structures
PDB	Ortholog search: PDBe RCSB
PDB	List of PDB id codes 1Y1E, 1Y1F, 1Y1G, 1Y1H, 1Y1I, 1Y1J, 1Z70, 2AFT, 2AFY, 2AII, 2AIJ, 2AIK, 2HI8, 2HIB

Identifiers
- Aliases: SUMF1, AAPA3037, FGE, UNQ3037, sulfatase modifying factor 1
- External IDs: OMIM: 607939; MGI: 1889844; HomoloGene: 16268; GeneCards: SUMF1; OMA:SUMF1 - orthologs

Gene location (Human)
Chr.	Chromosome 3 (human)
Band	3p26.1	Start	3,700,814 bp
Band	3p26.1	End	4,467,273 bp

Gene location (Mouse)
Chr.	Chromosome 6 (mouse)
Band	6|6 E1	Start	108,083,989 bp
Band	6|6 E1	End	108,162,543 bp
RNA expression pattern
Bgee	Human / Mouse (ortholog); Top expressed in: renal medulla; skin of arm; synovial membrane; synovial joint; tibia; human penis; skin of thigh; nipple; stromal cell of endometrium; pylorus / Top expressed in: ascending aorta; aortic valve; stroma of bone marrow; epithelium of lens; Epithelium of choroid plexus; conjunctival fornix; iris; supraoptic nucleus; cumulus cell; tunica media of zone of aorta; More reference expression data
BioGPS	n/a
Gene ontology
Molecular function	protein homodimerization activity; metal ion binding; oxidoreductase activity; Formylglycine-generating oxidase activity; cupric ion binding
Cellular component	endoplasmic reticulum lumen; endoplasmic reticulum
Biological process	post-translational protein modification; glycosphingolipid metabolic process
Sources:Amigo / QuickGO
Orthologs
Species	Human	Mouse
Entrez	285362	58911
Ensembl	ENSG00000144455	ENSMUSG00000030101
UniProt	Q8NBK3	Q8R0F3
RefSeq (mRNA)	NM_001164674; NM_001164675; NM_182760	NM_145937
RefSeq (protein)	NP_001158146; NP_001158147; NP_877437	NP_666049
Location (UCSC)	Chr 3: 3.7 – 4.47 Mb	Chr 6: 108.08 – 108.16 Mb
PubMed search
- Wikidata
View/Edit Human	View/Edit Mouse

Sulfatase-modifying factor 1 is an enzyme that in humans is encoded by the SUMF1 gene.

Sulfatases catalyze the hydrolysis of sulfate esters such as glycosaminoglycans, sulfolipids, and steroid sulfates. C-alpha-formylglycine (FGly), the catalytic residue in the active site of eukaryotic sulfatases, is posttranslationally generated from a cysteine by SUMF1, the human form of the aerobic Formylglycine-generating enzyme (FGE), in the endoplasmic reticulum (ER). The genetic defect of FGly formation caused by mutations in the SUMF1 gene results in inactive FGE, and subsequently multiple sulfatase deficiency (MSD; MIM 272200), a lysosomal storage disorder (Roeser et al., 2006).[supplied by OMIM]
