= Galactosamine-6 sulfatase =

Protein-coding gene in the species Homo sapiens

GALNS
Available structures
PDB	Ortholog search: PDBe RCSB
PDB	List of PDB id codes 4FDJ, 4FDI

Identifiers
- Aliases: GALNS, galactosamine (N-acetyl)-6-sulfatase, GALNAC6S, GAS, GalN6S, MPS4A
- External IDs: OMIM: 612222; MGI: 1355303; HomoloGene: 55468; GeneCards: GALNS; OMA:GALNS - orthologs

Gene location (Human)
Chr.	Chromosome 16 (human)
Band	16q24.3	Start	88,813,734 bp
Band	16q24.3	End	88,856,970 bp

Gene location (Mouse)
Chr.	Chromosome 8 (mouse)
Band	8|8 E1	Start	123,304,981 bp
Band	8|8 E1	End	123,338,202 bp
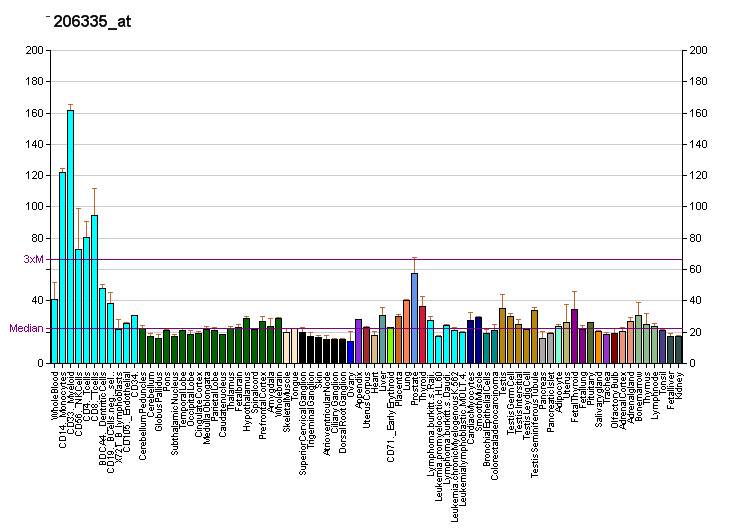
RNA expression pattern
Bgee	Human / Mouse (ortholog); Top expressed in: right uterine tube; sperm; right testis; left testis; stromal cell of endometrium; pituitary gland; anterior pituitary; bronchial epithelial cell; olfactory zone of nasal mucosa; right adrenal gland / Top expressed in: right kidney; granulocyte; proximal tubule; decidua; human kidney; epithelium of small intestine; gastrula; ileum; stroma of bone marrow; molar; More reference expression data
BioGPS	More reference expression data
Gene ontology
Molecular function	N-acetylgalactosamine-4-sulfatase activity; N-acetylgalactosamine-6-sulfatase activity; sulfuric ester hydrolase activity; catalytic activity; hydrolase activity; metal ion binding; arylsulfatase activity
Cellular component	lysosome; lysosomal lumen; extracellular exosome; extracellular region; azurophil granule lumen
Biological process	metabolism; keratan sulfate catabolic process; neutrophil degranulation
Sources:Amigo / QuickGO
Orthologs
Species	Human	Mouse
Entrez	2588	50917
Ensembl	ENSG00000141012	ENSMUSG00000015027
UniProt	P34059	Q571E4
RefSeq (mRNA)	NM_000512; NM_001323543; NM_001323544	NM_001193645; NM_016722
RefSeq (protein)	NP_000503; NP_001310472; NP_001310473	NP_001180574; NP_057931
Location (UCSC)	Chr 16: 88.81 – 88.86 Mb	Chr 8: 123.3 – 123.34 Mb
PubMed search
- Wikidata
View/Edit Human	View/Edit Mouse

N-acetylgalactosamine-6-sulfatase is an enzyme that, in humans, is encoded by the GALNS gene.

This gene encodes N-acetylgalactosamine-6-sulfatase, which is a lysosomal exohydrolase required for the degradation of the glycosaminoglycans keratan sulfate and chondroitin 6-sulfate. Sequence alterations including point, missense and nonsense mutations, as well as those that affect splicing, result in a deficiency of this enzyme. Deficiencies of this enzyme lead to Morquio A syndrome, a lysosomal storage disorder.
