= N-acetylglucosamine-6-sulfatase =

Protein-coding gene in the species Homo sapiens

Identifiers
- EC no.: 3.1.6.14
- CAS no.: 60320-99-2

Databases
- IntEnz: IntEnz view
- BRENDA: BRENDA entry
- ExPASy: NiceZyme view
- KEGG: KEGG entry
- MetaCyc: metabolic pathway
- PRIAM: profile
- PDB structures: RCSB PDB PDBe PDBsum
- Gene Ontology: AmiGO / QuickGO
Search
- PMC: articles
- PubMed: articles
- NCBI: proteins

GNS

Identifiers
- Aliases: GNS, G6S, glucosamine (N-acetyl)-6-sulfatase
- External IDs: OMIM: 607664; MGI: 1922862; HomoloGene: 1568; GeneCards: GNS; OMA:GNS - orthologs

Gene location (Human)
Chr.	Chromosome 12 (human)
Band	12q14.3	Start	64,713,445 bp
Band	12q14.3	End	64,759,431 bp

Gene location (Mouse)
Chr.	Chromosome 10 (mouse)
Band	10|10 D2	Start	121,200,995 bp
Band	10|10 D2	End	121,233,154 bp
RNA expression pattern
Bgee	Human / Mouse (ortholog); Top expressed in: visceral pleura; kidney tubule; retinal pigment epithelium; right adrenal cortex; stromal cell of endometrium; metanephric glomerulus; left adrenal gland; renal medulla; parietal pleura; periodontal fiber / Top expressed in: ciliary body; iris; stroma of bone marrow; retinal pigment epithelium; Epithelium of choroid plexus; vestibular membrane of cochlear duct; decidua; epithelium of lens; calvaria; saccule; More reference expression data
BioGPS	n/a
Gene ontology
Molecular function	sulfuric ester hydrolase activity; protein binding; catalytic activity; hydrolase activity; metal ion binding; N-acetylglucosamine-6-sulfatase activity; glycosaminoglycan binding
Cellular component	lysosome; lysosomal lumen; extracellular exosome; extracellular region; azurophil granule lumen; ficolin-1-rich granule lumen
Biological process	metabolism; glycosaminoglycan catabolic process; keratan sulfate catabolic process; glycosaminoglycan metabolic process; neutrophil degranulation
Sources:Amigo / QuickGO
Orthologs
Species	Human	Mouse
Entrez	2799	75612
Ensembl	ENSG00000135677	ENSMUSG00000034707
UniProt	P15586	Q8BFR4
RefSeq (mRNA)	NM_002076	NM_029364; NM_001364695
RefSeq (protein)	NP_002067; NP_002067.1	NP_083640; NP_001351624
Location (UCSC)	Chr 12: 64.71 – 64.76 Mb	Chr 10: 121.2 – 121.23 Mb
PubMed search
- Wikidata
View/Edit Human	View/Edit Mouse

N-acetylglucosamine-6-sulfatase (EC 3.1.6.14, glucosamine (N-acetyl)-6-sulfatase, systematic name N-acetyl-D-glucosamine-6-sulfate 6-sulfohydrolase) is an enzyme that in humans is encoded by the GNS gene. It is deficient in Sanfilippo Syndrome type IIId. It catalyses the hydrolysis of the 6-sulfate groups of the N-acetyl-D-glucosamine 6-sulfate units of heparan sulfate and keratan sulfate

== Function ==
N-acetylglucosamine-6-sulfatase is a lysosomal enzyme found in all cells. It is involved in the catabolism of heparin, heparan sulphate, and keratan sulphate.

== Clinical significance ==
Deficiency of this enzyme results in the accumulation of undergraded substrate and the lysosomal storage disorder mucopolysaccharidosis type IIID (Sanfilippo D syndrome). Mucopolysaccharidosis type IIID is the least common of the four subtypes of Sanfilippo syndrome.

== Nomenclature ==
The systematic name of this enzyme is "N-acetyl-D-glucosamine-6-sulfate 6-sulfohydrolase". Other accepted names include:

- N-acetylglucosamine-6-sulfatase,
- glucosamine (N-acetyl)-6-sulfatase,
- 2-acetamido-2-deoxy-D-glucose 6-sulfate sulfatase,
- N-acetylglucosamine 6-sulfate sulfatase,
- O,N-disulfate O-sulfohydrolase,
- acetylglucosamine 6-sulfatase,
- chondroitinsulfatase, and
- glucosamine-6-sulfatase.
