= SULF2 =

Protein-coding gene in the species Homo sapiens

Identifiers
- Aliases: SULF2, HSULF-2, sulfatase 2
- External IDs: OMIM: 610013; MGI: 1919293; GeneCards: SULF2
Enzyme activity
EC #	BRENDA	ExPASy	KEGG	MetaCyc
3.1.6.1	↗	↗	↗	↗
3.1.6.14	↗	↗	↗	↗

Gene location (Human)
Chr.	Chromosome 20 (human)
Band	20q13.12	Start	47,656,348 bp
Band	20q13.12	End	47,786,616 bp

Gene location (Mouse)
Chr.	Chromosome 2 (mouse)
Band	2|2 H3	Start	165,915,009 bp
Band	2|2 H3	End	165,997,583 bp
RNA expression pattern
Bgee	Human / Mouse (ortholog); Top expressed in: decidua; body of uterus; myometrium; left ovary; right ovary; ectocervix; left uterine tube; monocyte; tendon of biceps brachii; smooth muscle tissue / Top expressed in: tail of embryo; calvaria; genital tubercle; fossa; umbilical cord; condyle; abdominal wall; decidua; endothelial cell of lymphatic vessel; transitional epithelium of urinary bladder; More reference expression data
BioGPS	n/a
Gene ontology
Molecular function	calcium ion binding; arylsulfatase activity; metal ion binding; catalytic activity; sulfuric ester hydrolase activity; hydrolase activity; N-acetylglucosamine-6-sulfatase activity; glycosaminoglycan binding
Cellular component	Golgi apparatus; plasma membrane; cell surface; endoplasmic reticulum; Golgi stack; extracellular space
Biological process	glomerular basement membrane development; kidney development; positive regulation of canonical Wnt signaling pathway; chondrocyte development; embryonic skeletal system development; positive regulation of Wnt signaling pathway; negative regulation of fibroblast growth factor receptor signaling pathway; liver regeneration; cartilage development; glomerular filtration; response to wounding; regulation of hepatocyte proliferation; glial cell-derived neurotrophic factor receptor signaling pathway; positive regulation of vascular endothelial growth factor production; metabolism; esophagus smooth muscle contraction; innervation; bone development; heparan sulfate proteoglycan metabolic process
Sources:Amigo / QuickGO
Orthologs
Databases	NCBI: entry; OMA: entry
Species	Human	Mouse
Entrez	55959	72043
Ensembl	ENSG00000196562	ENSMUSG00000006800
UniProt	Q8IWU5	Q8CFG0
RefSeq (mRNA)	NM_001161841; NM_018837; NM_198596	NM_001252578; NM_001252579; NM_028072; NM_001355619
RefSeq (protein)	NP_001155313; NP_061325; NP_940998	NP_001239507; NP_001239508; NP_082348; NP_001342548
Location (UCSC)	Chr 20: 47.66 – 47.79 Mb	Chr 2: 165.92 – 166 Mb
PubMed search
- Wikidata
View/Edit Human	View/Edit Mouse

Extracellular sulfatase Sulf-2 is an enzyme that in humans is encoded by the SULF2 gene.

== Function ==
Heparan sulfate proteoglycans (HSPGs) act as coreceptors for numerous heparin-binding growth factors and cytokines and are involved in cell signaling. Heparan sulfate 6-O-endosulfatases, such as SULF2, selectively remove 6-O-sulfate groups from heparan sulfate. This activity modulates the effects of heparan sulfate by altering binding sites for signaling molecules (Dai et al., 2005).[supplied by OMIM]
