= Arylsulfatase A =

Mammalian protein in humans

ARSA
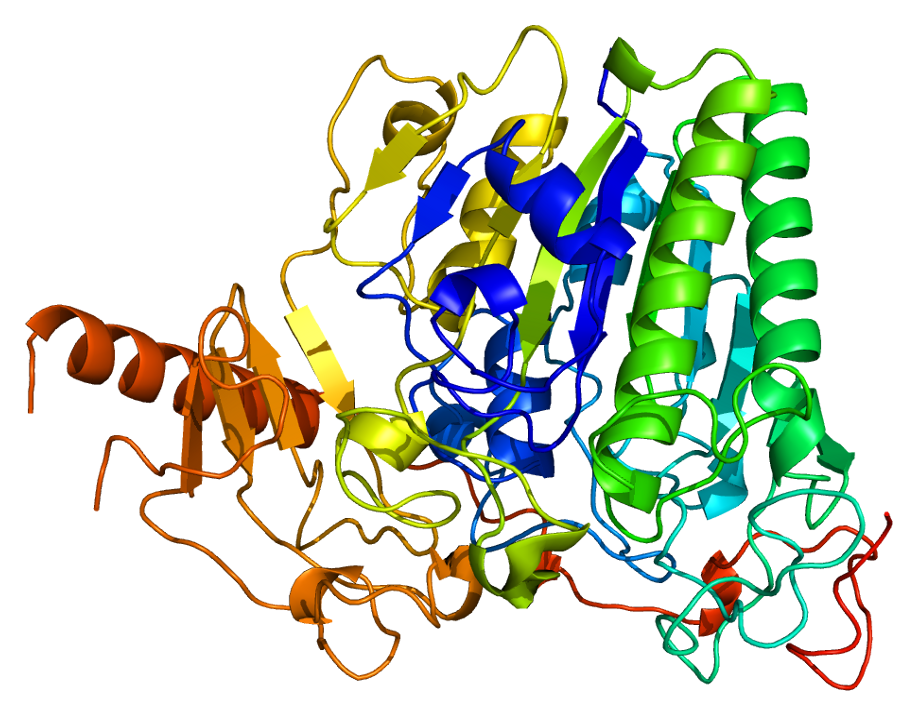

Identifiers
- Aliases: ARSA, MLD, arylsulfatase A, ASA
- External IDs: OMIM: 607574; MGI: 88077; GeneCards: ARSA
Available structures
PDB	Ortholog search: PDBe RCSB
PDB	List of PDB id codes 2HI8, 1AUK, 1E1Z, 1E2S, 1E33, 1E3C, 1N2K, 1N2L, 2AIJ, 2AIK
Enzyme activity
EC #	BRENDA	ExPASy	KEGG	MetaCyc
3.1.6.8	↗	↗	↗	↗

Gene location (Human)
Chr.	Chromosome 22 (human)
Band	22q13.33	Start	50,622,754 bp
Band	22q13.33	End	50,628,173 bp

Gene location (Mouse)
Chr.	Chromosome 15 (mouse)
Band	15|15 E3	Start	89,356,679 bp
Band	15|15 E3	End	89,361,628 bp
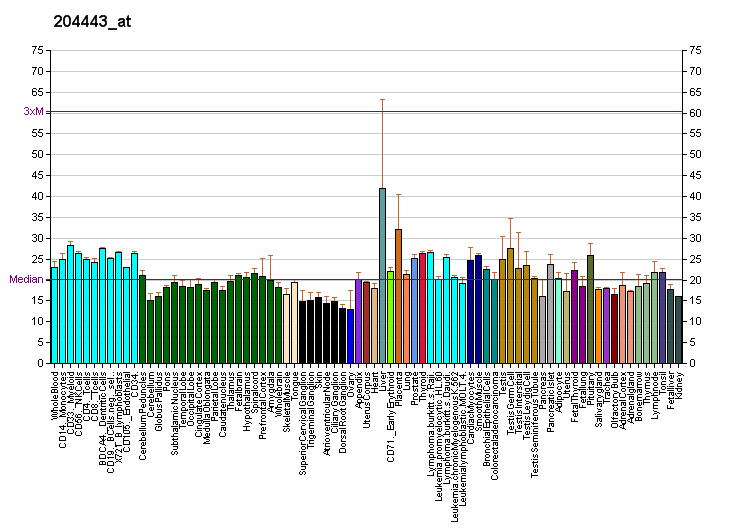
RNA expression pattern
Bgee	Human / Mouse (ortholog); Top expressed in: right uterine tube; right testis; granulocyte; mucosa of transverse colon; left testis; apex of heart; anterior pituitary; minor salivary glands; right lobe of thyroid gland; right hemisphere of cerebellum / Top expressed in: spermatocyte; spermatid; seminiferous tubule; decidua; medial dorsal nucleus; left lobe of liver; calvaria; motor neuron; brown adipose tissue; lateral geniculate nucleus; More reference expression data
BioGPS	More reference expression data
Gene ontology
Molecular function	calcium ion binding; cerebroside-sulfatase activity; sulfuric ester hydrolase activity; protein binding; hydrolase activity; catalytic activity; metal ion binding; arylsulfatase activity
Cellular component	lysosome; lysosomal lumen; extracellular exosome; endoplasmic reticulum lumen; extracellular region; azurophil granule lumen; endoplasmic reticulum
Biological process	post-translational protein modification; metabolism; glycosphingolipid metabolic process; neutrophil degranulation
Sources:Amigo / QuickGO
Orthologs
Databases	NCBI: entry; OMA: entry
Species	Human	Mouse
Entrez	410	11883
Ensembl	ENSG00000100299	ENSMUSG00000022620
UniProt	P15289	P50428
RefSeq (mRNA)	NM_000487; NM_001085425; NM_001085426; NM_001085427; NM_001085428 NM_001362782	NM_009713
RefSeq (protein)	NP_000478; NP_001078894; NP_001078895; NP_001078896; NP_001078897 NP_001349711	NP_033843
Location (UCSC)	Chr 22: 50.62 – 50.63 Mb	Chr 15: 89.36 – 89.36 Mb
PubMed search
- Wikidata
View/Edit Human	View/Edit Mouse

Arylsulfatase A (or cerebroside-sulfatase) is an enzyme that breaks down sulfatides, namely cerebroside 3-sulfate into cerebroside and sulfate. In humans, arylsulfatase A is encoded by the ARSA gene.

== Clinical significance ==
A deficiency in Arylsulfatase A is associated with metachromatic leukodystrophy, an autosomal recessive disease. Multiple sulfatase deficiency (MSD) is also associated with the ARSA gene.

== Biochemistry ==
=== Enzyme regulation ===
Arylsulfatase A is inhibited by phosphate, which forms a covalent bond with the active site 3-oxoalanine.
