= Achilles tendon rupture =

Medical condition where the tendon at the back of the ankle breaks

- Other names: Achilles tendon tear, Achilles rupture
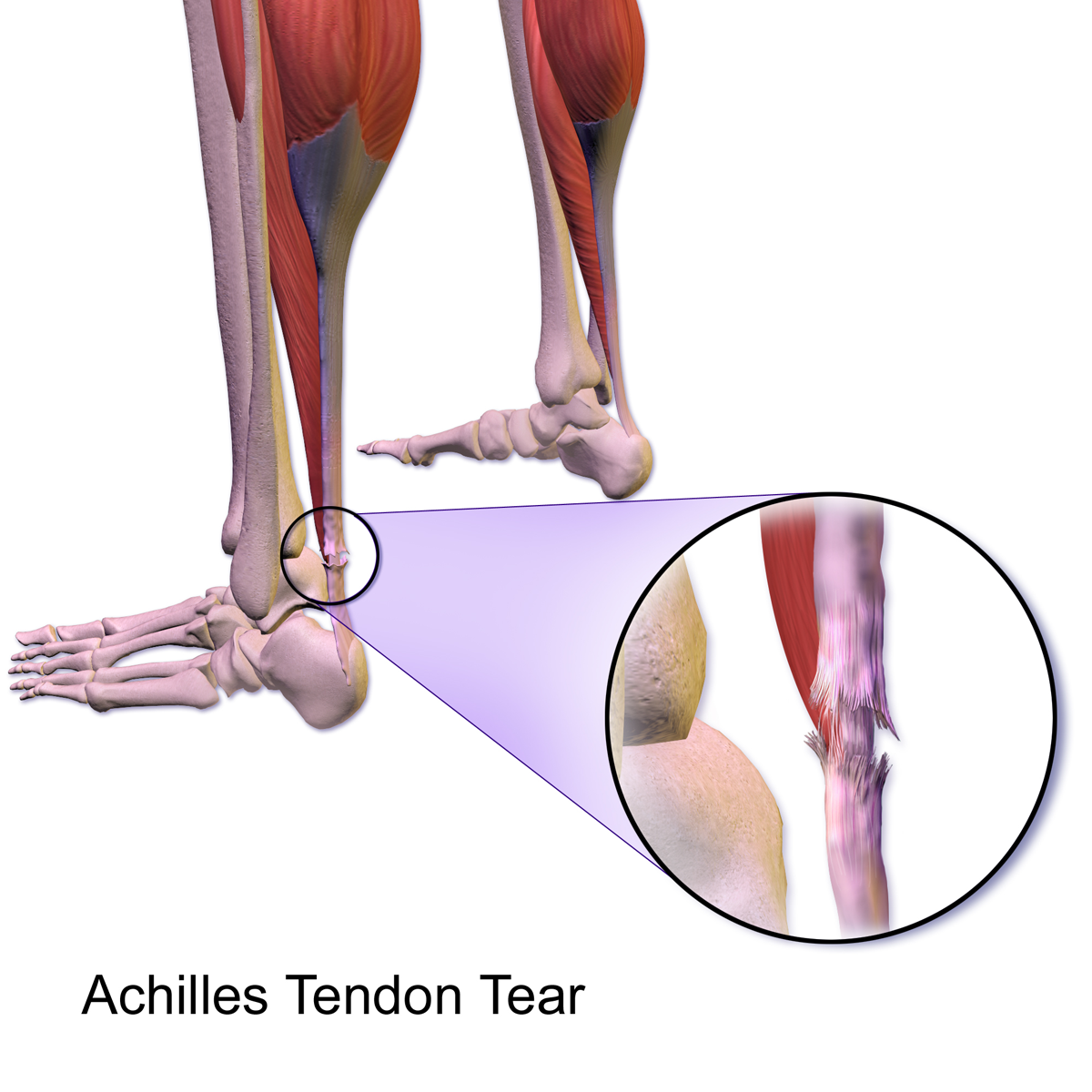
- The Achilles tendon
- Specialty: Orthopedics, emergency medicine
- Symptoms: Pain in the heel
- Usual onset: Sudden
- Causes: Forced plantar flexion of the foot, direct trauma, long-standing tendonitis
- Risk factors: Fluoroquinolones, significant change in exercise, rheumatoid arthritis, gout, corticosteroids
- Diagnostic method: Based on symptoms and examination, supported by medical imaging
- Differential diagnosis: Achilles tendinitis, ankle sprain, avulsion fracture of the calcaneus
- Treatment: Casting or surgery
- Frequency: 1 per 10,000 people per year

Achilles tendon rupture is the breakage of the Achilles tendon at the back of the ankle. Symptoms include the sudden onset of sharp pain in the heel. A snapping sound may be heard as the tendon breaks and walking becomes difficult.

Rupture of the Achilles tendon usually occurs due to a sudden, forceful push-off movement, an abrupt dorsiflexion of the foot while the calf muscle is engaged, or direct trauma. Chronic degeneration of the tendon, often from tendinosis, also increases the likelihood of rupture. Common risk factors include fluoroquinolone or corticosteroid use, sudden increases in physical activity, inflammatory conditions such as rheumatoid arthritis, gout, and chronic overuse or improper training. Diagnosis is primarily based on clinical symptoms and physical examination, with imaging such as ultrasound or MRI used for confirmation when needed.

Prevention may include stretching before activity and gradual progression of exercise intensity. Treatment may consist of surgical repair or conservative management. Quick return to weight bearing (within 4 weeks) appears acceptable and is often recommended. While surgery traditionally results in a small decrease in the risk of re-rupture, the risk of other complications is greater. Non-surgical treatment is an alternative as there is supporting evidence that rerupture rates and satisfactory outcomes are comparable to surgery. If appropriate treatment does not occur within 4 weeks of the injury outcomes are not as good.

The incidence of Achilles tendon ruptures varies in the literature, with recent studies reporting a rate of up to 40 patients per 100,000 patient population annually. The significant increase in ruptures this past decade is thought to be linked to the increased number of individuals engaging in sporting activities, particularly adults older than 30. During recreational sports, 75% of ruptures occur in men between the third and fourth decades of life.

== Signs and symptoms ==
The main symptom of an Achilles tendon rupture is the sudden onset of sharp pain in the heel. Additionally, a snap or "pop" may be heard as the tendon breaks. Some people describe the pain as a hit or kick behind the lower leg. There is difficulty walking immediately. It may be difficult to push off or stand on the toes of the injured leg. Swelling may be present around the heel.

== Causes ==
The Achilles tendon is most often injured by sudden downward or upward movement of the foot, or by forced upward flexion of the foot outside its normal range of motion. Other ways the Achilles tendon can be torn involve sudden direct trauma or damage to the tendon, or sudden use of the Achilles after prolonged periods of inactivity, such as bed rest or leg injury. Some other common tears can happen from intense sports overuse. Twisting or jerking motions can also contribute to injury. Some antibiotics, such as levofloxacin, may increase the risk of tendon injury or rupture. These antibiotics are known as fluoroquinolones. As of 2016 the mechanism through which fluoroquinolones cause this was unclear.

Many people may develop an Achilles rupture or tear, such as recreational athletes, older people, or those with a previous Achilles tendon injury. Tendon injections, quinolone use, and extreme changes in exercise intensity can contribute. Most cases of Achilles tendon rupture are traumatic sports injuries. The average age of patients is 29–40 years with a male-to-female ratio of nearly 20:1. Yet, recent studies have shown that Achilles tendon ruptures are rising in all ages up to 60 years of age. It has been theorized that this is due to the popularity of remaining active with older age. Additionally, even the occasional weekend exercise activity for "weekend warriors" may put one at risk. The risk continues to be higher in people who are older than 60, and also taking corticosteroids, or have kidney disease. Risk also increases with dose amount and for longer periods of time.

== Anatomy ==
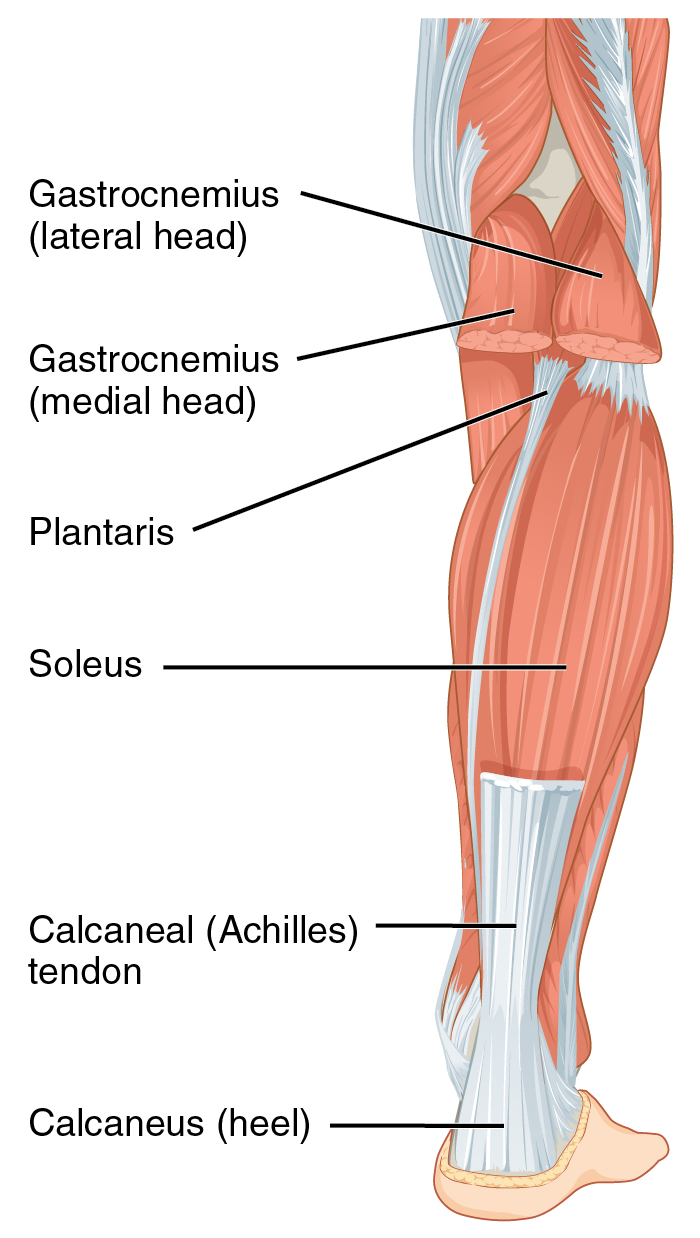
Achilles anatomy

The Achilles tendon is the strongest and thickest tendon in the body. It connects the calf muscles to the heel bone of the foot. The calf muscles are the gastrocnemius, soleus and the heel bone is called the calcaneus. It is approximately 15 centimeters (5.9 inches) long and begins near the middle part of the calf. Contraction of the calf muscles flexes the foot down. This is important in activities such as walking, jumping, and running. The Achilles tendon receives its blood supply from its muscular and tendon junction. Its nerve supply is from the sural nerve and to a lesser degree from the tibial nerve.

== Diagnosis ==
Calf squeeze test in a person with a right Achilles tendon rupture

Diagnosis is based on symptoms and history of the event. People describe it like being kicked or shot behind the ankle. During physical examination, a gap may be felt above the heel unless swelling is present. A common physical exam test the doctor or provider may perform is the Simmonds' test (aka Thompson test). To perform the test, have the person lay on their stomach, face down, and with their feet hanging from the exam table. The test is positive if squeezing the calf muscles of the affected side results in no movement (no passive plantarflexion) of the foot. The test is negative with an intact Achilles tendon and squeezing the calf muscle results in the foot flexing down. Walking is usually impaired, as the person will be unable to step off the ground using the injured leg. The person will also be unable to stand up on the toes of that leg, and pointing the foot downward (plantarflexion) is impaired. Pain may be severe, and swelling around the ankle is common.

Although a tear may be diagnosed by history and physical exam alone, an ultrasound scan is sometimes required to clarify or confirm the diagnosis. Once diagnosis is made, ultrasound imaging is an effective way to monitor the healing progress of the tendon over time. An ultrasound is recommended over MRI and MRI is generally not needed. Both MRI and ultrasound are effective tools and have their strengths and limitations. However, when it comes to an Achilles tendon tear, an ultrasound is usually recommended first because of convenience, quick availability, and cost.

=== Imaging ===
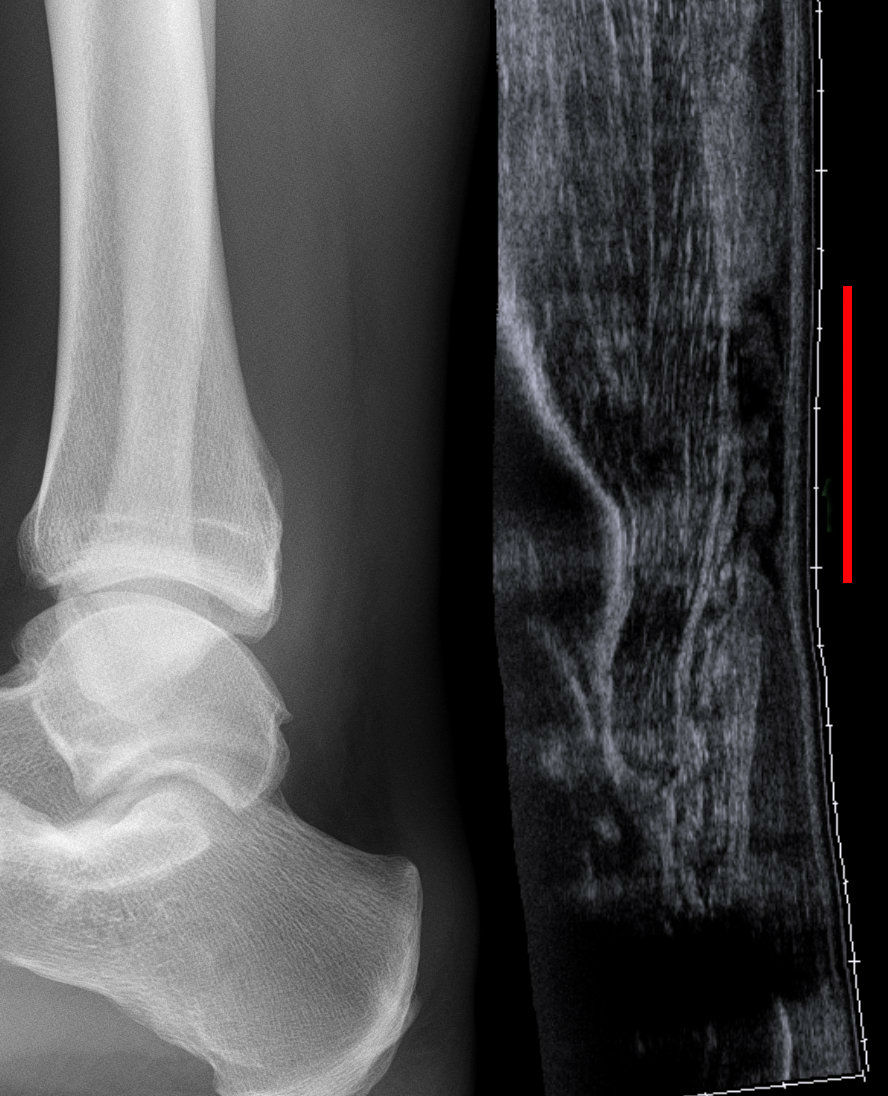
Achilles tendon rupture seen on ultrasound. Note discontinuity over several centimeters (red line). No fracture or avulsion (radiograph).

Ultrasonography can be used to determine the tendon thickness, character, and presence of a tear. It works by sending harmless high frequencies of sound waves through the body. Some of these sound waves reflect back off the spaces between fluid and soft tissue or bone. These reflected images are analyzed and created into an image. These images capture in real time and are helpful in detecting movement of the tendon and visualizing injuries or tears. This device makes it possible to identify injuries and observe healing over time. Ultrasound is inexpensive and involves no harmful radiation. It is operator-dependent and so requires a level of skill and practice for it to be used effectively.

MRI can be used to distinguish incomplete ruptures from degeneration of the Achilles tendon. MRI can also distinguish between paratenonitis, tendinosis, and bursitis. This technique uses a strong uniform magnetic field to align millions of protons running through the body. These protons are then bombarded with radio waves that knock some of them out of alignment. When these protons return they emit their own unique radio waves that is analyzed by a computer in 3D to create a sharp cross sectional image of the area. MRI provides excellent soft tissue imaging making it easier for technicians to spot tears or other injuries.

Radiography can also be used to indirectly identify Achilles tendon tears. Radiography uses X-rays to analyze the point of injury. This is not very effective at identifying soft tissue injuries. X-rays are created when high energy electrons hit a metal source. X-ray images are acquired by utilizing the different densities of the bone or tissue. When these rays pass through tissue they are captured on film. X-rays are generally best for dense objects such as bone while soft tissue is shown poorly. Radiography is not the best for assessing an Achilles tendon injury. It is more useful for ruling out other injuries such as heal bone fractures.

=== Differential diagnosis ===
Some conditions to consider when diagnosing an Achilles tendon tear are Achilles tendinitis, ankle sprain, and avulsion fracture of the calcaneus.

== Treatment ==
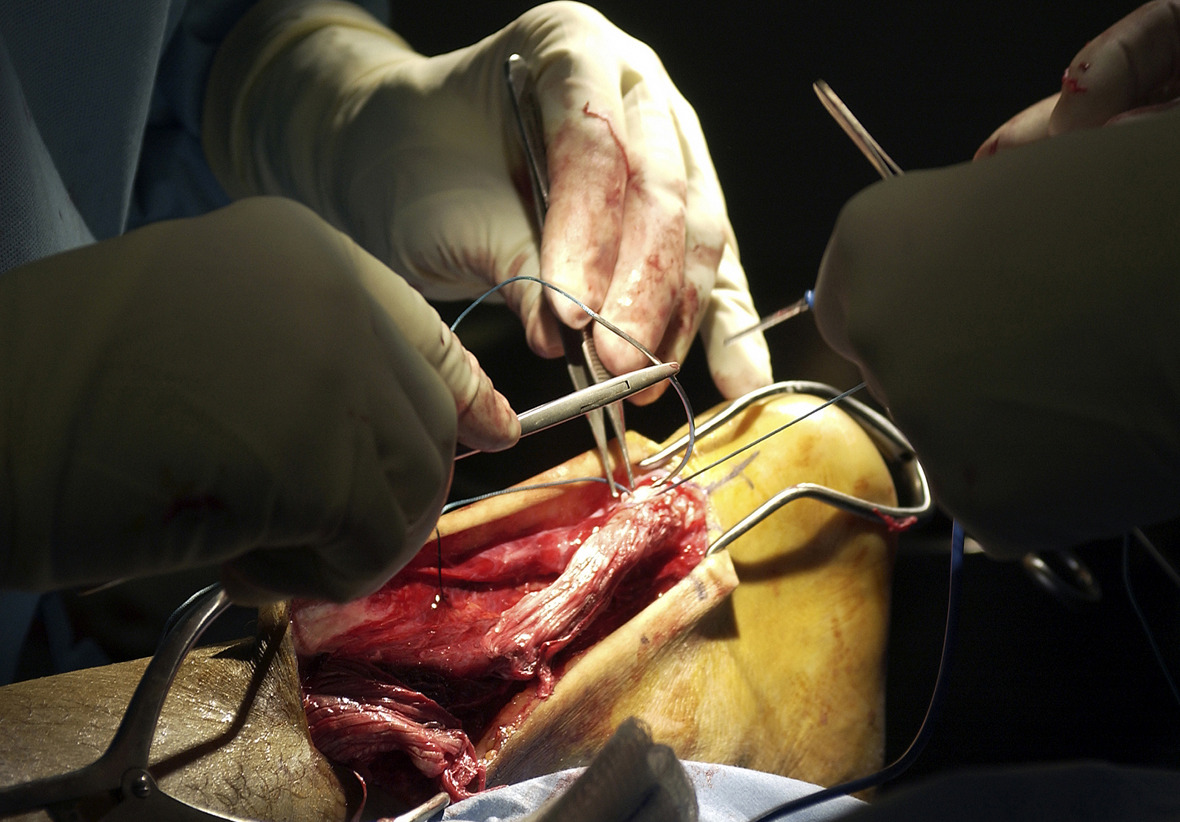
Surgical repair of a ruptured Achilles tendon

Treatment options include surgery and non-surgical rehabilitation. Surgery has shown a lower risk of re-rupture. However, it has a higher rate of short-term problems. Surgery complications include leg clots, nerve damage, infection, and clots in the lungs. The most common problem after non-surgical treatment is leg clots. The main problem after surgery is infection. Certain rehabilitation techniques have shown similar re-rupture rates to surgery. In centers without early range of motion rehabilitation available, surgery is preferred to decrease re-rupture rates. Around 80% of individuals return to sport after treatment for Achilles tendon rupture, though recovery time and outcomes vary based on rehabilitation and how return to sport is assessed.

=== Surgery ===
There are at least four different types of surgeries; open surgery, percutaneous surgery, ultrasound-guided surgery, and WALANT surgery.

During an open surgery, an incision is made in the back of the leg and the Achilles tendon is stitched together. In complete ruptures, the tendon of another muscle is used and wrapped around the Achilles tendon. Commonly, the tendon of the plantaris is used and this wrapping increases the strength of the repaired tendon. If the quality of tissues is poor, such as from a neglected injury, a reinforcement mesh is an option. These meshes can be of collagen, Artelon or other degradable material. In the case of both poor tissue and significant loss of the Achilles tendon, the flexor hallucis longus tendon can be used. The flexor hallucis longus tendon of the big toe is transferred with free tissue (skin flap) in a process described as a one-stage repair.

In percutaneous surgery, several small incisions are made, rather than one large incision. The tendon is sewn back together through the incision(s). Surgery is often delayed for about a week after the rupture to let the swelling go down. For sedentary patients and those who have vascular diseases or risks for poor healing, percutaneous surgical repair may be the better surgical option. Surgical care is evolving, with minimally invasive and percutaneous surgical techniques. These developments hope to lessen the risk of wound complications and infections found with open surgery. These techniques are more challenging than traditional open surgery, with a learning curve for surgeons, and are not yet widely used.

=== Rehabilitation ===
The management of Achilles tendon ruptures has evolved. Modern treatment for both surgical and non-surgical pathways now emphasizes early functional rehabilitation over prolonged immobilization. This approach utilizes a removable functional orthosis (boot) that allows for protected weight-bearing and controlled ankle motion, often beginning within the first week. Current evidence supports initiating structured physiotherapy immediately, starting with protected movement and isometric exercises, rather than after a delay. Rehabilitation follows a progressive tendon-loading program, advancing through exercises like heel raises to rebuild strength. High-quality studies indicate that with identical accelerated rehabilitation protocols, functional outcomes for non-surgical and surgical management have become comparable for many patients[27].

There are three things to consider with Achilles rupture rehabilitation. These are range of motion, functional strength, and sometimes orthotic support. Range of motion is important because it takes into mind the tightness of the repaired tendon. When beginning rehabilitation, a person should perform light stretches. Over time, the goal should be to increase the intensity of that stretch. Stretching the tendon is important because it stimulates connective tissue repair. This can be done while performing the "runner's stretch". The runner's stretch involves putting the toes a few inches up a wall while the heel is on the ground. Doing stretches to gain functional strength is also important because it improves healing in the tendon. This will in turn lead to a quicker return to activities. These stretches should continue to increase in intensity over time. Over time the goal is to include some weight bearing, to reorient and strengthen the collagen fibers in the injured ankle. A popular stretch used for this phase of rehabilitation is the toe raise on an elevated surface. The patient is to push up onto the toes and lower themselves as far down as possible and repeat several times. The other part of the rehab process is orthotic support. This does not have anything to do with stretching or strengthening the tendon, rather it is in place to keep the patient comfortable. These are custom-made inserts that fit into the patient's shoe. They help with proper pronation of the foot, where the ankle leans toward the middle of the body.

In summary, the steps of rehabilitating a ruptured Achilles tendon begin with range of motion type stretching. Studies have shown that the earlier movement is started, the better. This will allow the ankle to get used to moving again and get ready for weight-bearing activities. This is followed by functional strength. This is where weight-bearing should begin to strengthen the tendon. The intensity should gradually increase over time. The end goal is to get the person to resume their normal and athletic activities.

== Epidemiology ==
Of all the large tendon ruptures, 1 in 5 will be an Achilles tendon rupture. An Achilles tendon rupture is estimated to occur in a little over 1 per 10,000 people per year. Males are also over 2 times more likely to develop an Achilles tendon rupture as opposed to women. Achilles tendon rupture tends to occur most frequently between the ages of 25–40 and over 60 years of age. Sports and high-impact activity is the most common cause of rupture in younger people, whereas sudden rupture from chronic tendon damage is more common in older people. The rate of return to sports in the months or years following the rupture (whether operated on or not, partial or total) is 70–80%.
