= EAMC =

EAMC may refer to:

- Dwight D. Eisenhower Army Medical Center, a medical facility at Fort Eisenhower, Georgia, U.S.
- East Avenue Medical Center, a hospital in Quezon City, Philippines
- Exercise-associated muscle cramps, cramping during or immediately following exercise
