= Health issues in athletics =

The health issues of athletics concern athletes' physical and mental well-being in organized sport. If athletes are physically or mentally underdeveloped, they are susceptible to various problems. Efforts to improve performance can lead to harm from overtraining or adopting eating habits that damage them physically or psychologically, such as using steroids or supplements.

== Female athlete triad ==
The female athlete triad is a condition among women that consists of three related health irregularities: disordered eating habits, irregular menstruation, and premature bone loss or osteoporosis. The term was coined in the early 1990s when researchers from the National Institutes of Health noticed unusual health patterns among female athletes. These researchers observed increases in eating habit disorders in young female athletes. Exercising intensely while getting inadequate nutrition can lead to amenorrhea—or irregular menstrual cycles—which in turn can lead to osteoporosis. Factors that can lead to developing triad syndrome include frequent weigh-ins and consequences for any weight gain. Sports that emphasize a low body weight and lean physique, like gymnastics and running, can increase the risk of developing the female athlete triad syndrome.

== Gender difference in athletes ==
Salk discusses gender difference in depression, noting that female athletes are more affected than male athletes. Zhang writes about the challenges female athletes face related to depression and notes that women's track and field has the highest percent for depression among athletes. Zhang also talks about how female athletes are more likely to have depression than male athletes.

== Mental Health in athletes ==
Mental health is an important aspect of athlete health and performance. Research has identified anxiety, depression, psychological distress, and sleep disturbances among current former elite athletes. A 2016 systematic review by Simon Rice and colleagues found that athletes may experience mental health challenges associated with sporting factors , including injury, overtraining, and burnout, as well as factors outside the sport. The International Olympic Committee has also emphasized the importance of identifying mental health concerns and providing appropriate support for athletes. Access to mental health professionals and supportive sporting environments to help athletes address psychological challenges alongside their physical health needs.

== Competitive thinness ==
Female athletes tend to compare themselves to their competitors, which is another factor for athletes to develop female athlete triad. Competitive thinness is a term used when athletes compare themselves to their rivals who are performing better than them. When athletes begin to compare themselves to their competitors and notice the athletes who are performing better than them are thinner, it can lead to a weight loss mentality. Another risk factor to competitive thinness is related to revealing uniforms. For aesthetic sports, these uniforms are normally very tight, which shows off the athletes' body. These uniforms can cause athletes to develop unhealthy body comparisons.

== Over-training ==
A female athlete who feels pressured to maintain a certain physique or body weight may exercise excessively and develop eating disorders to restrict calorie intake. Over-exercising increases the need for rest; her overall energy declines, causing her total body fat and estrogen levels to drop - a condition known as amenorrhea. Both male and female athletes may feel the pressure to over-train excessively in order to achieve a certain body image. The human body has a tremendous capacity to adapt to physical stress. "Stress" does not mean only physical damage. It can also refer to activity beneficial to bones, muscles, tendons, and ligaments, making them stronger and more functional. This is also known as "remodeling," and involves both the breakdown and buildup of tissue. However, if breakdown occurs more rapidly than buildup, an overuse injury can result. Nearly half of all injuries encountered in pediatric sports medicine are due to overuse. An overuse injury is traumatic damage to a bone, muscle, or tendon that is subjected to repetitive stress without time to heal naturally, as a result of long or high-intensity workouts. Many young athletes participate in sports year-round or on multiple teams at once. Within the past seven years. Majority of children from ages 6–12 have participated in a team or individual sport. Another factor could be parental pressure to compete and succeed. Other risk factors include sleep deprivation, general physical and cognitive immaturity, dietary imbalance and inadequate physical fitness. Among young athletes, a common form of overuse injury is stress fractures, which include injuries of the:

- femoral neck/pubis
- femoral shaft
- tibia
- fibula
- metatarsals
- calcaneus
- cuboid

'Over-training Syndrome' is a term that has been used to describe athletes who, while training for competition, train beyond the body's ability to recover naturally. Common warning signs include tiredness, soreness, drop in performance, headaches, and loss of enthusiasm. Without adequate rest and recovery, training regimens can backfire, eventually harming an athlete's performance. Over-training can also be associated with eating disorders; athletes can turn to excessive exercise in order to lose weight. Over-training syndrome is also associated with Exercise-Induced Central Fatigue which is fatigue in our central nervous system caused by hyperactivity in our neurotransmitters responding to stress. Central fatigue often leads to mood disorders, sleep disturbances, or depression. In cases where athletes are over-training, the most effective treatment is rest and proper nutrition.

== Mental health ==
Athletes tend to be at higher risk for serious mental health complications than non-athletes due to increased stresses from sports and potential injury. One reason for higher vulnerability may be because athletes are less likely to seek help or pursue treatment. This may be attributed to the stigma that it makes them look "weak". This stigma creates a sense of fear that makes these athletes push through the mental pain. Along with physical injury, mental health can be affected by an array of various other factors such as serious concussions, body standards, pressure from a highly competitive atmosphere, etc. Studies have shown that collegiate athletes are at a higher risk for problems such as depression, suicidal ideation, alcohol and substance use, and disordered eating, with an estimated 33% of Division 1 collegiate athletes self-identifying as being depressed. It was also found that 26% of college athletes were moderately to severely inclined to seek mental health services. Even more concerning, suicide is the fourth leading cause of death among college sports participants, with 9% of athletes across all divisions of the NCAA feeling the need to pursue suicide prevention. Alcohol and substance use remains an issue as well, with upwards of 52% of collegiate athletes reporting to have consumed five or more drinks on numerous occasions in the last year. Of these consumers, 11% indicated the need to get help for alcohol related problems. In 2017, the NCAA also found that roughly 22% of its participants used Marijuana, which is a banned substance for all athletes.

In the United States each year, 3.5 million sports participants are injured, causing a short or long term disruption from sport. Injured athletes may exhibit high rates of depression and anxiety, followed by low rates of self-esteem directly following an injury and throughout the duration of recovery and return to play. Research has shown that athletic injury has a significant psychological impact on the athlete. A number of studies conducted between athletes who have been injured vs. athletes who have not gone through an injury show that injured athletes undergo greater negative effects, lower self-esteem, and higher levels of depression and anxiety. Likewise, studies done on athletes before and after injury show that there are greater levels of mood disturbance, lowered self-esteem and increased rates of depression following injury.

In more recent times the COVID-19 pandemic has caused athletes to suffer through a tremendous pause in their usual sports routine. Athletes and their mental health had been impacted poorly because of the limits that the pandemic has placed in their lives. An abrupt change in the lives of elite athletes during the pandemic had negative effects on athletes and their performance. A cohort study that was created to examine the amount of training, sports performance, physical and mental health among Swiss elite athletes for a 6-month follow up period. During the course of the study 203 Swiss elite athletes participated in repeated amounts of online surveys which were created to examine health, training, and sports performance. Over the course of the 6-month lockdown it had been analyzed that sports performance and mental health had been negatively affected due to the realities of the COVID-19 pandemic. Research has shown that because of the lack of social interaction, it particularly affected those student athletes that identify with or value sports highly. Stricter COVID-19 restrictions were related with decreased subjective sports execution, as well as lower preparing escalated, expanded money related fears, poorer adapting with limitations, and more depressive indications, as measured by the 9-item module of the Understanding Wellbeing Questionnaire-9 (PHQ-9). Selby reports that the athletes are depressed. They have to get help with their depression, but this challenge can be hard because they are embarrassed. Athletes who are depressed usually behave more quietly, and they are less talkative. They usually will stay away from the crowd and try to cope by themselves. They sometimes overthink that they are not good enough or when they are unable to figure something out that they think should be easy, they struggle to get past it because their emotions are so complicated by having depression.

Mental health problems can also begin to appear early in adolescence. Early exposure to the same intense training and competition can increase the risk of stress, fatigue, and emotional exhaustion. Studies have suggested that these effects can continue into adulthood and influence our mental well-being and participation for sports later in life.

=== Depression ===
In the United States each year, 3.5 million sports participants are injured, causing a short or long term disruption from sport. Injured athletes may exhibit high rates of depression and anxiety, followed by low rates of self-esteem directly following an injury and throughout the duration of recovery and return to play. Athletes that are in between the ages of 18 and 25 have a 15 to 21 percent chance of suffering from depression that is more than double the number of adults.

=== Perfectionism ===
It is common for athletes, especially those of elite status, to strive for perfectionism in their sport. Coaches may pound it into their athletes that "practice makes perfect" - a common misconception that with more and more training, perfectionism will be reached. Although having high standards may be part of elite athletics and can, in return, be beneficial for the athlete's performance, this idea that nothing but a perfect performance is good enough plays a key role in developing a negative self-concept and a fear-of-failure syndrome. Individuals who struggle with a negative self-concept and strive towards perfectionism may excessively engage in cognitive rumination about the need to be perfect. They may also be more susceptible to be more concerned about every little mistake, struggle with forgetting about a past error, and doubt their physical abilities. These athletes may be at a significantly higher risk of a low self-esteem in results of the slightest negative feedback. Athletes who over-strive for perfectionism also put themselves at risk to experience more levels of negative emotions and heightened levels of anxiety and depression.

It is common for athletes, especially those of elite status, to strive for perfectionism in their sport. Coaches may pound it into their athletes that "practice makes perfect" - a common misconception that with more and more training, perfectionism will be reached. Although having high standards may be part of elite athletics and can, in return, be beneficial for the athlete's performance, this idea that nothing but a perfect performance is good enough plays a key role in developing a negative self-concept and a fear-of-failure syndrome. Individuals who struggle with a negative self-concept and strive towards perfectionism may excessively engage in cognitive rumination about the need to be perfect. They may also be more susceptible to be more concerned about every little mistake, struggle with forgetting about a past error, and doubt their physical abilities.

Athletes, in particular those athletes who juggle sport and studies at the same time, have the task of controlling their studies, leading a healthy lifestyle, taking care of any possible injuries they might incur, and managing their performance anxiety. All these could contribute to the pressure on the athletes’ part. However, no matter all these stresses, failure to perform in competition appears to be one of the greatest causes leading to increased vulnerability to depression. Stress builds as they attempt to balance the workload they are given, working to satisfy the coaching staff, and continuing to try to play at their best. Constant demand to perform at their best is very hard to attain and puts wear and tear on the human body and mind. That is why athletes turn away from the sport they have been playing since childhood, because they no longer have the mental fortitude to continue.

=== Suicide ===
As mentioned previously, psychological distress as a result from a sports related injury has been shown to increase the risk of suicide among athletes. In a review of five collegiate athletes who committed suicide, several common factors were found. These included: considerable success before injury, serious injury requiring surgery, long rehabilitation with restriction to play, inability to return to the prior level of play, and being replaced in his or her position by a teammate. The greatest predictor of suicide was the severity of their injury. Other risk factors for suicide included stressful life events, chronic mental illness, family history of suicidal tendency, and psychiatric disorders of any type.

Depression is a leading cause of suicide. One study that investigated depression in retired athletes found that one of the largest barriers to seeking help was that athletes did not recognize symptoms of depression and, therefore, would not see the need to seek treatment. Undetected and untreated depression can lead to suicide or suicidal ideation in the worst cases.

Previous research has looked at the relationship between athletic status, gender, depression, and suicidality. Athletes who base their identities solely around the sport they play may be at higher risk for depression and possible suicidal ideation if the athletic status may be disturbed. These studies showed that a high amount of athletic identity did not significantly predict depression scores, but it did show a positive association with higher odds of attempting suicide.

=== Help-seeking behaviors ===
There is a stigma associated with mental health in athletes. Many barriers are present for athletes to find treatment for their mental health issues. It may be considered weak, and they should be conditioned to 'push through' the psychological pain and obstacles. Another barrier may be explaining to the athlete their right to privacy, though it is sometimes the athlete's trainer, coach, or team physicians who provide the resources for the athlete to seek help. It has been hypothesized in previous studies that athletes underutilize mental health services, which may be concerning due to the level of depression in athletes particularly. Health care professionals or a sports medicine staff working with the athlete may play a key role in identifying the signs of depression or other mental illnesses in athletes and refer them to the proper resources such as a sports psychologist. There are many sport psychology interventions that may be helping maintain athletes' mental health and preventing any psychological disorder. Sport practitioners and researchers focus on mindfulness and resilience as two key factors that contribute to an athlete's well-being. Mindfulness has been shown to help with the general well-being of an athlete and also aid in the enhancement of athletic performance. Interventions based on mindfulness have been shown to assist both clinical and subclinical psychological concerns in athletes.

By having poor mental health student athletes are stripped from their peak athletic performance, their ability to fully engage with their academics, and it amplifies the pressure they put on themselves. This creates a low self-compassion student athlete who struggles to find the good in themselves and the ability to deal with their own problems. Many student athletes fear they will be stigmatized by their coaches, teammates, and fans if they reach out to mental health centers. So instead of getting help they hold their negative thoughts within trying to fight off their mental state. Negativity from outside voices control their self -esteem and diminishes whatever they have left that keeps them going throughout the day. Ultimately, this can result in the athlete struggling with their mental health before it is too late to reel them back in to get help. This could lead the athlete to taking their own life and or thinking very negatively about themselves because of unrealistic expectations.

== Supplements/steroids ==
Anabolic steroids are artificially produced hormones called androgens, which are essentially male-type sex hormones in the body. The most powerful of the androgens is testosterone. Another group of steroids are steroidal supplements, a weaker form of androgens. Steroids and supplements are controversial when used for sports because of the health risks associated with them. Some serious and long-term effects on the body are hair loss, dizziness, mood swings, delusions, paranoia, high blood pressure, and increased risk of heart disease, stroke, and even cancer. More recent studies also suggest that steroid users have an increased risk of depression and alcohol use later in life. Doctors call this the 'snowball effect' of steroid-related health problems. Injury patterns suggest that joint ligaments are not able to adapt to steroid-enhanced muscles, leading to injury.

== Heat illness ==
Heat illness and dehydration are typically brought on by high temperatures and high humidity. These conditions carry increased risk for young athletes, particularly at the beginning of a season, when they are less fit. Other factors that increase vulnerability include: heat-retaining clothing, recent illness, previous experience with heat illness, chronic conditions, and sleep deprivation. Additional precautions should be taken if a child is taking supplements or using cold medication.

Heat illnesses are among the primary causes of sports-related death or disability. They require immediate medical attention. Symptoms to watch for are as follows:

- dry or sticky mouth
- headache
- dizziness
- cramps
- unusual fatigue
- confusion
- loss of consciousness

Sport injuries are always the result of overuse or trauma to a part of the body. An issue unique to youth athletics is that the participants' bones are still growing, making them especially at risk for injury. Around 8,000 children are rushed to the emergency room daily because of sports injuries. High school athletes sustain approximately 715,000 injuries annually. In American football, for instance, five times as many catastrophic injuries happen in high school as in college-level competition. Injuries include heat illness and dehydration, concussions, and trauma-related deaths. Heat illnesses are a rising concern in youth athletics. These illnesses include heat syncope, muscle cramps, heat exhaustion, heat stroke and exertional hyponatremia. Each year, high school athletes sustain 300,000 head injuries, of which 90% are concussions. By the start of high school, 53% of athletes will have already suffered a concussion, but fewer than 50% of them say anything because they are concerned they will be removed from play. Ice hockey, soccer, lacrosse, wrestling and basketball have a high risk of concussion, with football carrying the most risk. A history of concussion in a football player can contribute to sports-related sudden death.

=== Prevention ===
To prevent an injury, proper warm-up is extremely important, because it lets athletes increase their heart rates. According to an article by nsmi.org.uk: "Warming up before a sport" they state that, "The warm-up should gently prepare the body for exercises by gradually increasing the heart rate and circulation; this will loosen the joints and increase blood flow to the muscles" (Warming 1). Proper warm-up also increases muscle temperature. Warm muscles are less susceptible to injuries because they can contract more forcefully and relax more quickly. As a result, both speed and strength can be enhanced. Also, the probability of over-stretching a muscle and causing injury is much lower. Warm-ups also increase body and blood temperature, which allows more oxygen to reach the muscles, improves muscle elasticity, and reduces the risk of strains and pulls. Other forms of prevention include strengthening muscles, increasing flexibility, taking breaks, weight training, and playing safe. Mental preparation is also important before practice or games. Clearing the mind and visualizing skills and strategy can relax the athlete's muscles and build concentration. Along with mental preparation, drinking plenty of water before games is very important. Staying hydrated is how to prevent injuries like heat illness.

Physical therapy for sports injuries is an essential aspect of recovery for athletes participating in different sporting activities. It also helps people to maintain form and optimal physical condition.

=== Post-injury response ===
Post-injury response creates more stressors, including coping and adjustment, as well as a combination of psychological and physical rehabilitation which lead to the process of returning to play. The Integrated Model of Psychological Response to the Sport Injury and Rehabilitation Process is one example of a cognitive appraisal and stress process during injury. This model shows how the injury becomes another stressor in the athlete's life, which, in return, leads to a process of cycles that include thoughts, feelings, and actions. Post-injury management would reflect a healthier outcome if the proper steps are taken with regards to mental health resource availability, such as a sports psychologist. Past research on sports medicine and sports science, observed from a biopsychosocial view, showed a better understanding of mental and physical health in injured athletes with regards to the best practices for psychological intervention and management efforts. One of the best interventions is an interpersonal intervention such as solution-focused brief counseling and social support from coaches and teammates. This support takes place during the injury and also post-injury throughout the rehab and back to play processes.

Stress plays a major role in an athlete's response to rehabbing an injury and the process of returning to play. The psychological response to an injury may trigger various mental health issues including depression or suicidal ideation, anxiety, disordered eating, and substance abuse.

== Concussions ==
The pattern of depression following concussions is different between collegiate and high school athletes. A study done on high school and college athletes found that for high school athletes, depression levels returned to a near baseline level two weeks prior to the concussion. Conversely, collegiate athletes experienced peak depression levels two weeks following the initial implication. This is most likely due to the heightened investment in the athlete's sports performance in the college environment paired with the rigorous academic load that many students endure at universities. Scholarships can also play a part in that collegiate athletes are concerned with their return-to-sport times and contributions to their teams. It is said to be very important to properly monitor depression levels following concussions as they can hinder the athlete's recovery time.

Another study considered the white matter integrity of retired NFL athletes who had endured a number of concussive and subconcussive injuries. Monitoring the players over time resulted in a rough relationship between white matter disruption and depressive symptoms. In a similar study, former NFL players were also examined and their BDI-II scores were considered using the Buckley three-factor model. The results portrayed that the cognitive factor was the only one which was seemingly related to the number of concussions sustained by the player. This concluded that the cognitive symptoms of depression, ranging from sadness to guilt, are influenced by head trauma. Upon the communication of the results to the test subjects, it became clear that many of them had not sought help for their depression due to the fact that they were unable to self-diagnose the symptoms.

To fully understand the role of concussions as opposed to other physical injuries, a different study compared the psychological effects of concussions and ACL injuries. The conclusion was drawn that athletes with ACL injuries demonstrated higher emotional disturbance levels than athletes with concussions . It was observed that concussed athletes underwent mood disturbances as well as depressive symptoms, whereas ACL injury subjects only underwent depressive changes. This is most likely due to the neurological impacts that concussions have on thought processes. ACL injuries have psychological effects, but there is no physical injury to the brain.

== Sports-related death ==
Sometimes sports injuries can be so severe that they lead to death. In 2010 48 youths died from sports injuries. The leading causes of death in youth sports are sudden cardiac arrest, concussion, heat illness and external sickling. Cardiac-related deaths are usually due to an undiagnosed cardiovascular disorder. Trauma to the head, neck and spine can also be lethal. Among young American athletes, more than half of trauma-related deaths take place among football players, with track and field, lacrosse, baseball, boxing, and soccer also having relatively high fatality rates.

== Mental health crisis ==
Throughout the past few years, there has been a dramatic increase in mental health issues among student athletes. Student athletes report feeling overwhelmed, experiencing a lack of energy, anxiety, depression and various other mental health issues. In the past year, five student athletes have taken their own lives in part due to mental health challenges they were facing. There are varying opinions on the best way to approach mental health issues within the student athlete community. Some believe that schools should provide mental health counselors available for student athletes. Others believe that student athletes do not feel comfortable enough seeking mental health help due to the stigma surrounding it. Instead, they believe that work needs to be done towards eliminating the stigma surrounding mental health, and work to ensure athletes and universities value mental health the same as physical health. Sports injuries can contribute to emotional struggles such as isolation, anxiety, and depression, often impacting an athlete's identity. Injury prevention screenings can identify risk factors by assessing range of motion, strength, balance, and movement patterns. Athletic trainers play a crucial support role during recovery, helping athletes maintain confidence and mental focus. Each year, approximately 12 million youth suffer sports injuries, resulting in 20 million missed school days and around $33 billion in healthcare costs.
