= Tendon cell =

Details
- Location: Tendon

Identifiers
- Latin: tendinocytus
- MeSH: D000070916
- TH: H3.03.00.0.00024, tendinocytus

In animal and human biology, a tendon cell is a cell that makes up tendons, the bands of connective tissue that connects muscles to bones. Tendon cells, also known as tenocytes or tendon fibroblasts, are specialized cells that contribute to the structure, function, and repair of tendons in the body. Tendons are fibrous tissues that connect muscles to bones, and tendon cells play a vital role in maintaining tendon homeostasis and facilitating healing following injury.

== Function ==
Tendon cells are primarily responsible for the production and maintenance of the tendon extracellular matrix (ECM), which consists mainly of collagen fibers. These cells are involved in synthesizing collagen and other ECM components that provide tendons with tensile strength. Tendon cells also participate in remodeling the ECM in response to mechanical stress and injury.

== Structure ==
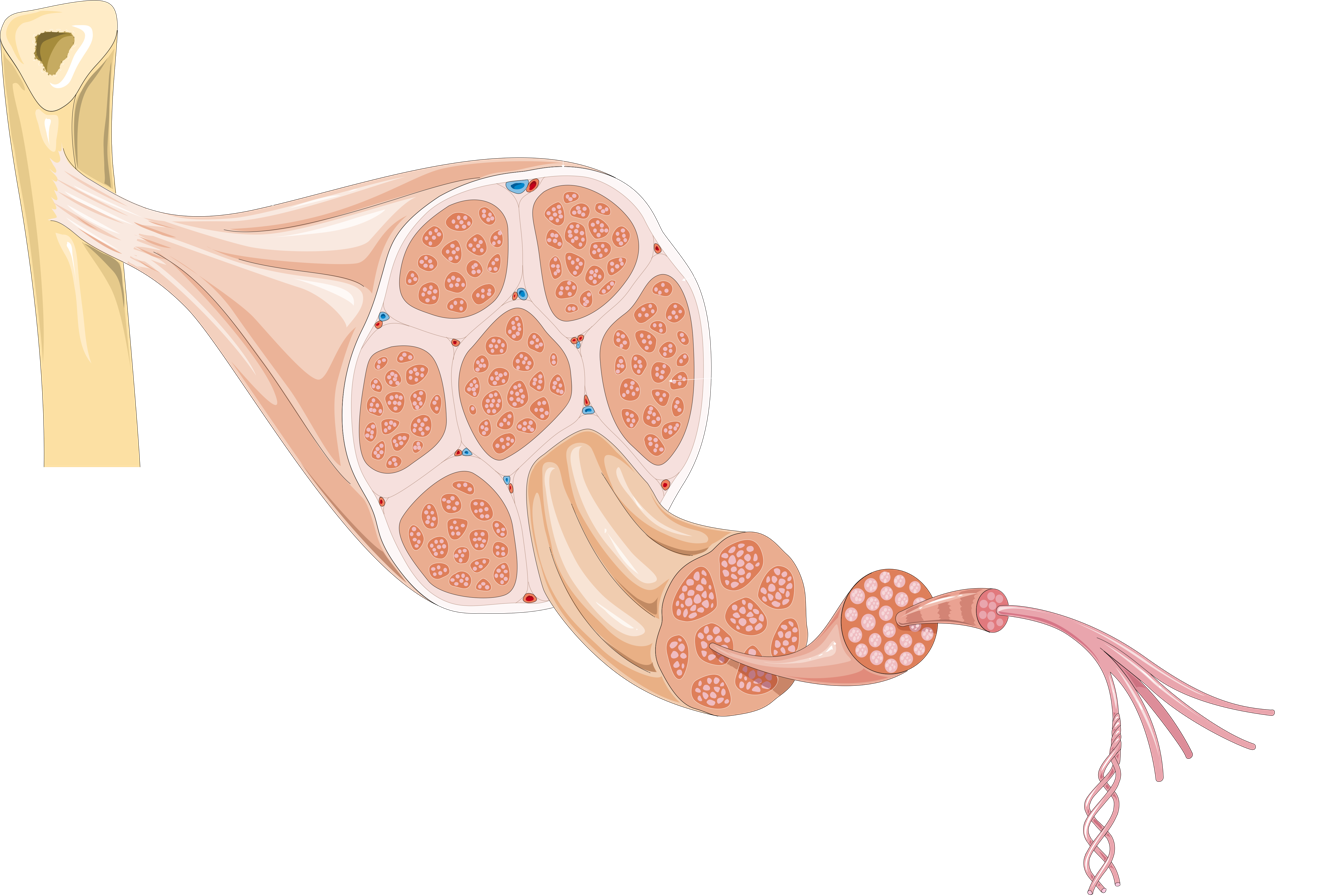

Tendon cells are typically elongated, spindle-shaped cells that align along the axis of tendon fibers. They contain large amounts of rough endoplasmic reticulum to support the production of collagen. The unique structure of tendon cells allows them to withstand mechanical stress and contribute to tendon strength and flexibility.

=== Types ===
- Tenocytes: The mature tendon cells responsible for maintaining tendon structure and function.
- Tendon Progenitor Cells (TPCs): Tendon progenitor cells are involved in tendon repair and regeneration, particularly after injury.
- Fibroblasts: A more general type of connective tissue cell, fibroblasts in tendons also contribute to the synthesis of ECM components.

== Development and Differentiation ==

Tendon cells originate during fetal development from mesenchymal stem cells, which differentiate into tenocytes and fibroblasts. In adults, tendon cells maintain the integrity of the tendon through continuous remodeling. The regeneration capacity of tendon cells is limited, which can make healing after injury slower compared to other tissues.

Research has identified several molecular players that govern tendon cell differentiation and development. These include transcription factors (e.g., Scleraxis (Scx), Sox9) and signaling pathways (e.g., BMPs, Wnt, Fgf), which regulate tendon precursor cells and their transition into mature tenocytes. However, the full spectrum of molecular regulators remains largely unknown, and understanding these molecular networks is a key goal for future research.

== Vertebrates ==
Tendon cells, or tenocytes, are elongated fibroblast type cells. The cytoplasm is stretched between the collagen fibres of the tendon. They have a central cell nucleus with a prominent nucleolus. Tendon cells have a well-developed rough endoplasmic reticulum and they are responsible for synthesis and turnover of tendon fibres and ground substance.

== Invertebrates ==
Tendon cells form a connecting epithelial layer between the muscle and shell in molluscs. In gastropods, for example, the retractor muscles connect to the shell via tendon cells. Muscle cells are attached to the collagenous myo-tendon space via hemidesmosomes. The myo-tendon space is then attached to the base of the tendon cells via basal hemidesmosomes, while apical hemidesmosomes, which sit atop microvilli, attach the tendon cells to a thin layer of collagen. This is in turn attached to the shell via organic fibres which insert into the shell. Molluscan tendon cells appear columnar and contain a large basal cell nucleus. The cytoplasm is filled with granular endoplasmic reticulum and sparse golgi. Dense bundles of microfilaments run the length of the cell connecting the basal to the apical hemidesmosomes.

== Injury and Repair ==
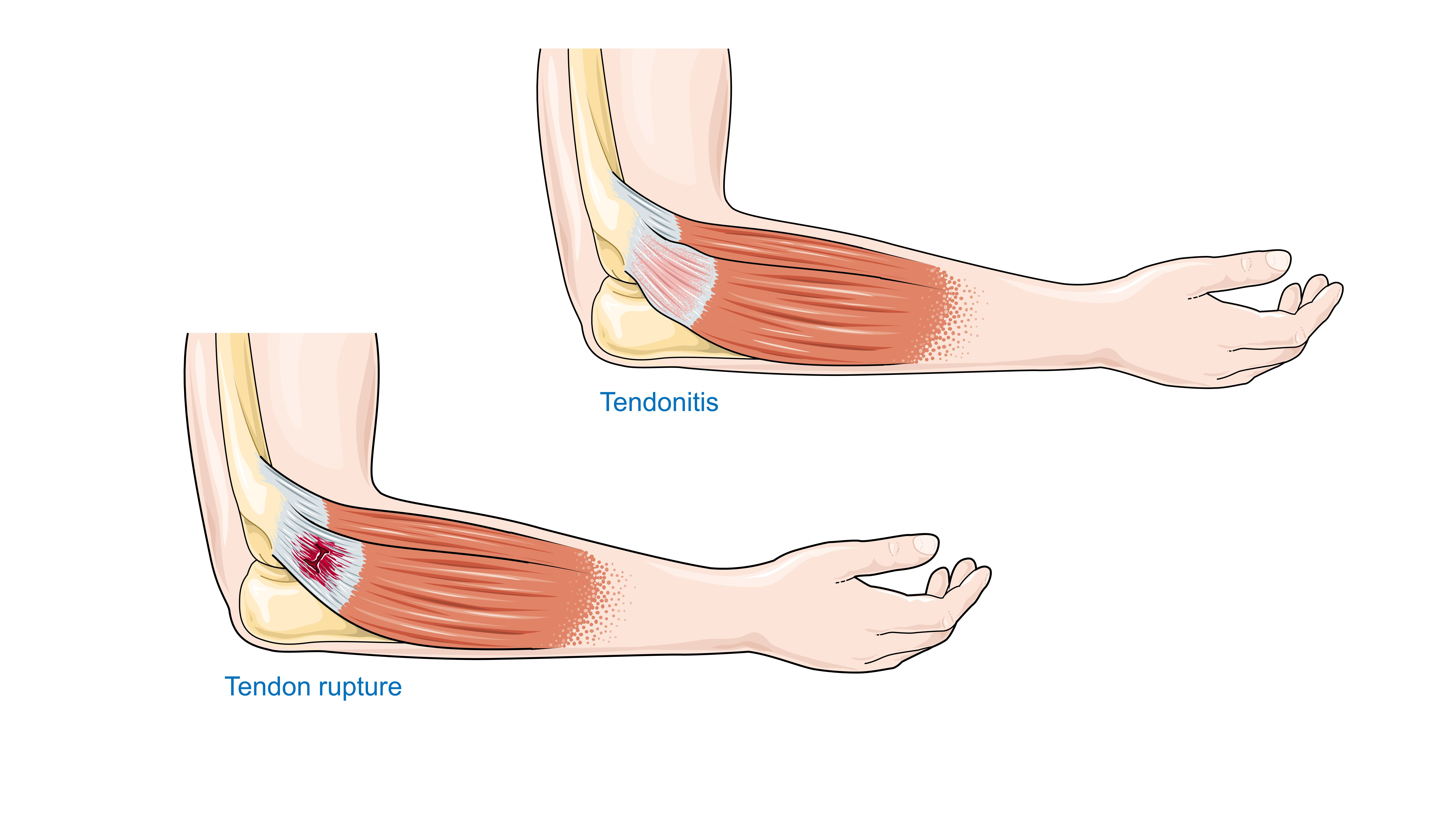

When tendons are injured, tendon cells are activated to promote repair, but this process can be slow. Recent research has focused on improving tendon healing through therapies such as stem cell injections, growth factors, and tissue-engineered approaches to enhance tendon cell activity and regeneration.

=== Tendonopathy ===
Tendinopathy refers to a spectrum of tendon disorders, including tendinitis and tendinosis, characterized by pain, swelling, and impaired function of the tendon. Tendon rupture involves the partial or complete tear of the tendon, which can occur acutely or as a result of chronic degeneration. Both conditions are common in athletes and the aging population, but effective treatments and therapies remain limited due to an incomplete understanding of the underlying biology.

== Challenges in Tendon Cell Research ==
Despite their importance in tendon function and repair, expanding tenocytes in vitro for therapeutic purposes remains a significant challenge. The main hurdle in this area is the phenotypic drift that occurs during the in-vitro culture of tenocytes. These cells tend to lose their characteristic elongated morphology and tenogenic properties when grown in culture for extended periods. This drift complicates their use in regenerative medicine and tendon tissue engineering, as it limits the cells' ability to maintain their functional and structural roles in tendon repair.

One of the primary reasons for the phenotypic drift of tenocytes in culture is the loss of their characteristic elongated shape. Under normal conditions, tenocytes are elongated to facilitate the interaction with surrounding collagen fibers. This morphology is important for maintaining their function in the tendon tissue. However, when cultured in conventional conditions, tenocytes often undergo a morphological shift, adopting a more rounded shape and losing their specialized functionality. This drift in phenotype can be detrimental to their ability to effectively regenerate tendon tissue. Given the challenges associated with in vitro tenocyte expansion and autologous tenocyte availability, alternative strategies need to be explored. Some of the promising approaches include:

1. Stem cell-based therapies: Mesenchymal stem cells or induced pluripotent stem cells (iPSCs) can be differentiated into tenocytes in vitro. These cells offer an almost unlimited source for expanding tendon-like cells, which could be used for tendon repair and regeneration. However, their differentiation protocols still require optimization to achieve functional tenocytes that closely mimic the native tendon environment.
2. Tendon tissue engineering: Combining tenocytes (or stem cells) with biomaterials, such as scaffolds, that mimic the natural tendon extracellular matrix is a promising avenue for tendon repair. These scaffolds can provide structural support and guide the differentiation and organization of tendon cells.
3. Gene editing: Techniques like CRISPR-Cas9 could be used to enhance the tenogenic properties of stem cells or to correct defects in autologous tenocytes derived from the patient's own tissue. This approach could allow for more controlled and efficient tendon regeneration.

== See also ==
- List of human cell types derived from the germ layers
- List of distinct cell types in the adult human body
