= Sports injury =

Physical and emotional trauma

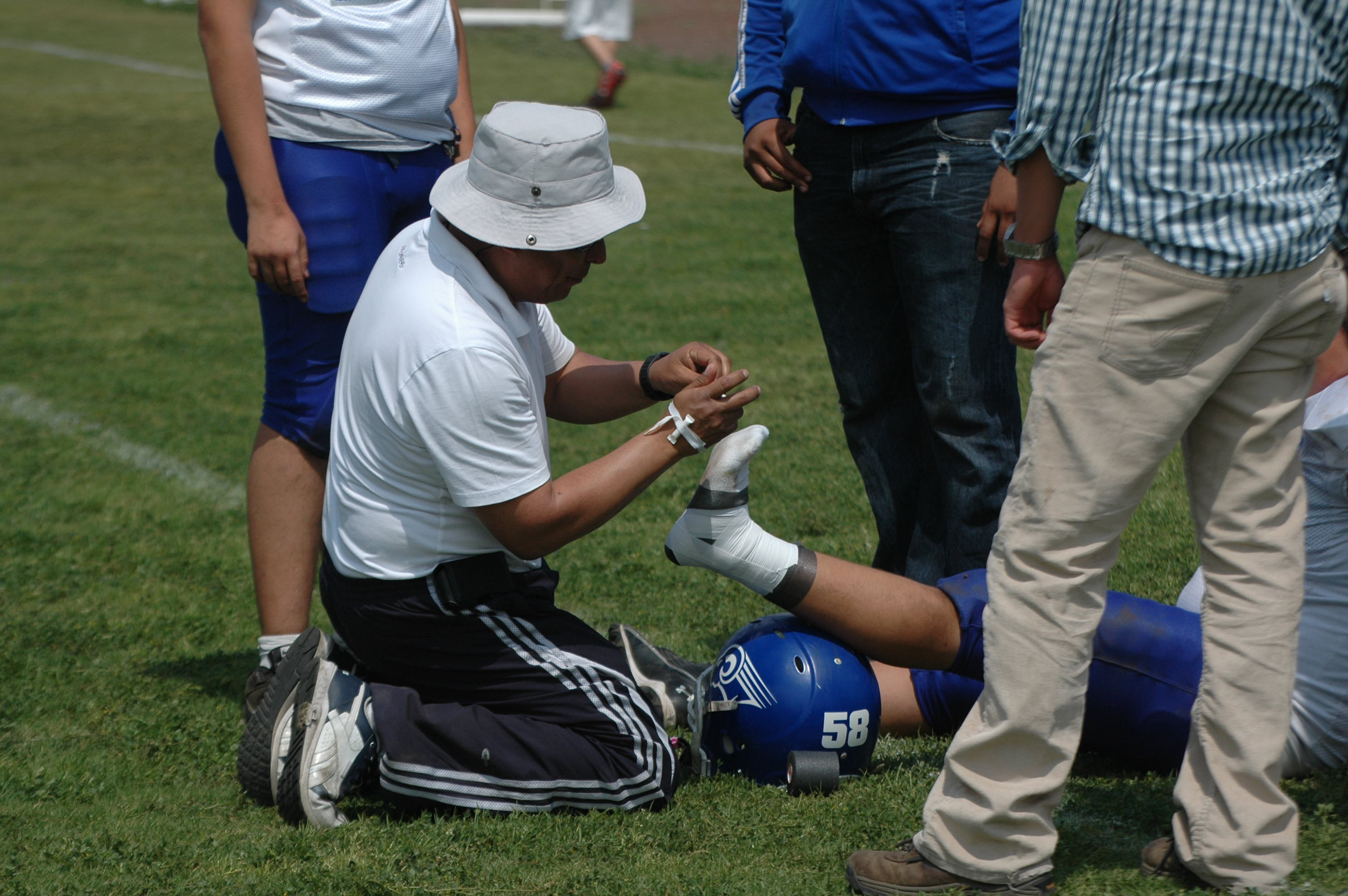
Player getting ankle taped at an American football game in Mexico.

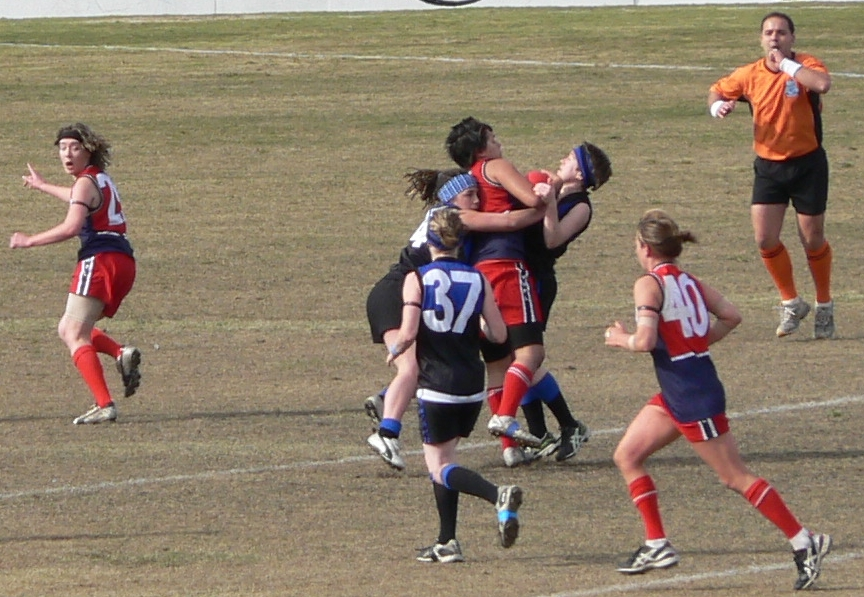
Tackles like this one in women's Australian rules football can cause injuries.

Sports injuries occur during participation in sports or exercise in general. Globally, around 40% of individuals engage in some form of regular exercise or organized sports, with upwards of 60% of US high school students participating in one or more sports. Sports injuries account for 15 - 20% of annual acute care visits with an incidence of 1.79 - 6.36 injuries per 1,000 hours of participation. Sports injuries can be broken down into the types of injuries, risk factors and prevention and the overall impact that injuries have on athletes.

== Types of sport injury ==
Types of sports injuries vary greatly based on gender, age and sport. Nonetheless, those with the highest prevalence remain contusions, fractures and sprains, followed closely by wounds and overuse injuries. Also common, the possible severity of head and neck injuries are important to consider. It is also paramount to place emphasis on the specific injuries that are most commonly encountered by sports medicine specialists.

=== Soft tissue injuries ===
Soft tissue injuries can be divided into those that affect the connective tissue (such as the skin), ligaments, tendons, or muscles. Injuries affecting the integument or the skin, can be classified as contusions, abrasions, and lacerations. Contusions or bruises are the simplest and most common injuries and are usually a result of blunt force trauma. Severe contusions may involve deeper structures and can include nerve or vascular injury. Abrasions are superficial injuries to the skin that result from a shearing force and are no deeper than the most superficial tissue layer, the epidermis. Bleeding, when present, is minimal. Minor abrasions generally do not scar, but deeper abrasions generally bleed and may scar. Lacerations occur from blunt trauma and result in a puncture through the skin, leaving an open wound. Facial lacerations are the most variable of the soft tissue injuries that athletes can sustain. They can occur intraoral or extraoral, and vary from a superficial skin nick to a lip laceration, or involve significant vascular disruption or injury to collateral vital structures.

Another major set of soft tissue injuries are those that affect the tendons and ligaments involved in the function of weight bearing joints. Of the various ligament and tendon injuries sustained during sports, those that hold particular importance for sports medicine providers due to their high prevalence are described in the following table:

=== Table: Prevalence and Implications of Common Soft Tissue Sports Injuries ===
Orthopedic Complaint	Prevalence	Mechanism of Injury	Management	Time Out from Sports	Re-Injury Rate	Source
Ankle Sprains (Ligament)	~25-30% of sports injuries; 0.5-1 per 1000 athlete-exposures (A-E)	Inverson/eversion of the ankle (twisting) or landing awkwardly	RICE (Rest, Ice, Compression, Elevation), bracing, physical therapy; surgery for tears	1-6 weeks with upwards of 3-6+ months based on severity	20-40% within 1-2 years	Hootman et al. (2007)
ACL Tears (Ligament)	~5-10% of knee injuries; 0.2-0.4 per 1000 A-E in high-risk sports (e.g., soccer)	Pivoting with excess force, especially with locked knee, direct impact	Surgical reconstruction (common), rehab (6-12 months)	6-12 months (surgical); 2-6 months (non-surgical)	15-30% (same or opposite knee, with high risk of OA development)	Hootman et al. (2007); Ardern et al. (2014)
Meniscal Injuries (Cartilage)	~10-20% of knee injuries; 0.33-0.7 per 1000 A-E in sports (e.g., soccer, basketball)	Twisting/pivoting or compressive force through the knee	Conservative (rest, rehab) for minor tears; arthroscopic repair or meniscectomy for severe tears	4-12 weeks (conservative/meniscectomy); 3-6 months (repair)	15-25% (same knee, often with OA progression)	Hootman et al. (2007)
Hamstring Strains (Muscle/Tendon)	~10% of sports injuries with a 9.4-fold higher occurrence during a match	Muscle overload during sprinting or kicking	RICE, stretching, strengthening; prolonged physical therapy for severe injuries	2-8 weeks (mild-severe)	13.9-63.3% within 2 years	Maniar et al. (2023), de Visser et al. (2012)
Achilles Tendinopathy (Tendon)	~5-10% of running injuries; 42% in individual sports (overuse context)	Repetitive overuse (e.g., running, jumping) Presents as pain in the heel due to dysfunction and degeneration of the tendon	Muscles lengthening (eccentric) exercises, rest, orthotics; surgery rare (<5% of cases)	4-12 weeks (conservative); 4-6 months (surgery)	27% (conservative management)	Aicale et al. (2018)
Rotator Cuff (Shoulder) Injury (Tendon/Muscle)	~18-40% in overhead sports (e.g., swimming, baseball)	Repetitive overhead motion or acute trauma	Physical therapy, corticosteroid injections; surgery for full tears	4-12 weeks (conservative); 4-6 months (surgery)	7.7% in partial or full thickness tears	Tooth et al. (2020), Klouche et al. (2015)
*Athlete Exposures are calculated as the total number of injuries that occur over the total amount of times that a given athlete is exposed to a particular activity, multiplied by 1000 [(total # injuries / A-E) x 1000]

=== Bony injuries ===
Types of hard tissue injuries can include dental and bone injuries and are less frequent than soft tissue injuries in sport, but are often more serious. Hard tissue injuries to teeth and bones can occur with contusions, such as Battle sign, which indicates basilar skull fracture, and so-called raccoon eyes, which indicate midface fractures. However, tooth fractures are the most common type of tooth injury, and can be categorized as crown infractions, enamel-only fracture, enamel-dentin fractures, and fractures that extend through the enamel and dentin into the pulp which is defined below.

- Crown infractions are characterized by a disruption of the enamel prisms from a traumatic force, these injuries typically present as small cracks that affect only the enamel.
- Enamel-only fractures are mild and often appear as roughness along the edge of the tooth crown. These injuries typically can go unnoticed by the athlete as they are usually not sensitive to the touch or temperature changes. Enamel-only fractures are not considered dental emergencies and immediate care is not needed.
- Enamel-Dentin crown fractures typically present as a tooth fracture confined to enamel and dentin with loss of tooth structure, but not exposing the pulp. The athlete often will report sensitivity to air, cold or touch, but the athlete can return to play as tolerated and referral can be delayed up to 24 hours.
- Enamel-Dentin-Pulp fractures extend through the enamel and dentin and into the pulp. If the pulp is vital, a focal spot of hemorrhage will be noticeable within the yellow dentin layer and the athlete may report acute pain. Referral to a trauma-ready dentist should occur as soon as possible.

In addition to tooth fractures, there are several types of bone fractures as well. These types being closed or simple, open or compound, greenstick, hairline, complicated, comminuted, avulsion, and compression. A complicated fracture is when the structures surrounding the fracture are injured, such as blood vessels, organs, nerves, etc.

=== Overuse injuries ===
Overuse injuries can be defined as injuries that result from a mechanism of repetitive and cumulative micro-trauma, that exceeds tissue repair capacity. Overuse injuries can be divided into three primary categories, tendinopathy, stress reaction and stress fractures, and Juvenile Osteochondritis Dissecans. Tendinopathy is the result of accumulative micro-trauma and degenerative changes to the tissue that can predispose to pain and even rupture with activity. Tendinopathy progresses in stages from tendinitis which is inflammatory driven, to later tendinosis which is primarily degenerative. The lack of inflammation in this later stage is in fact what hinders the body's ability to heal the injury. Stress reaction and stress fractures occur due to accumulative trauma to bone that leads to an imbalance between bone cleavage and replacement leaving the bone prone to micro-damage (stress reactions) and stress fractures.

A common cause for both these types of injuries are increase in training frequency and can be associated with poor technique, or other external factors like training on hard surfaces or long distance sports. Finally, the rapid changes in physical growth in children leave them prone to overuse injuries, especially Juvenile Osteochondritis Dissecans, in which the bone-cartilage interface is affected. This disease is driven primarily by repetitive micro-trauma sustained while training and can lead to pain in the affected joints. The disease predominately affects athletes undergoing rapid periods of growth, therefore as the athlete's bodies continue to mature, the disease tends to self-resolve.

=== Head and neck injuries ===
Sports-related head and neck injuries account for a large portion of athletic trauma, and the severity of these injuries account for an estimated 70% of sports-related mortality and 20% permanent disability. In the United States, approximately 1.6 to 3.8 million sports-related concussions occur annually, with contact sports such as football, hockey, and soccer carrying the highest incidence.

Concussion, the most common sports-related head injury, results from disrupted neurologic function due to significant mechanical forces imparted on the brain, plus resulting inflammation. Continuing research into sports related concussions has shown that repeat concussions can lead to a disorder called chronic traumatic encephalopathy (CTE), characterized by memory loss, lack of impulse control, amongst a myriad of mental health and movement disorders.

Sideline evaluation of concussed athletes includes symptom assessment, cognitive testing, and balance examination. Imaging, like CT-scan, is reserved for cases when intracranial hemorrhage, or bleeding into the brain, is suspected. Return-to-play protocols are designed to ensure a stepwise and timely recovery to prevent second-impact syndrome, a severe condition caused by swelling of the brain tissue.

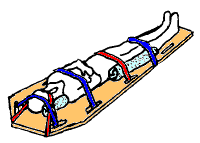
Spinal Immobilization

Head and neck injuries commonly co-occur. When examining a patient with a neck injury, a physician will use specialized maneuvers in conjunction with a neurologic examination, to evaluate if the neck injury is causing compression or disruption of the nerve roots. Should a spinal cord injury be suspected, the athlete will be placed into spinal immobilization and sent for further testing. If an athlete with a head injury is unconscious, they are assumed to have a spinal cord injury and full spinal immobilization is required.

Several strategies, such as rule modifications and protective equipment have helped decrease the risk of head and neck injuries, especially in high contact sports like football and hockey. However, the effectiveness of such strategies has shown more efficacy for preventing concussions as compared to neck injuries. Given the severity of such injuries, the Concussion in Sport Group holds regular conferences to evaluate the literature on the topic and propose updated guidelines for prevention and management of these injuries.

== Risk factors ==
Recent changes to load management for athletes and fear of overtraining led to a groundbreaking study by the International Olympic Committee in 2016, in which the committee hoped to identify risk factors predisposing athletes to overuse and risk of injury. The study performed a systematic review with an inclusion of 106 prior studies on load and injury risk. A major takeaway from the study was the analysis of how external versus internal factors predispose to injury and how these factors can be managed to avoid injury. Intrinsic or personal factors that could put an athlete at higher risk for injury could be gender. For example, female athletes are typically more prone to injuries such as ACL tears. There is approximately a 1.6-fold greater rate of ACL tears per athletic exposure in high school female athletes than in males of the same age range. Other intrinsic factors are age, weight, body composition, height, lack of flexibility or range of motion, coordination, balance, and endurance. In addition, biological factors such as pes planus, pes cavus, and valgus or varus knees can cause an athlete to have improper biomechanics and become predisposed to injury. There are also psychological factors that are included in intrinsic risk factors. Some psychological factors that could make certain individuals more subject to injury include personal stressors in their homes, school, or social life. There are also extrinsic risk factors that can affect an athlete's risk of injury. Some examples of extrinsic factors would be sport-specific protective equipment such as helmets, shoulder pads, mouth guards, and shin guards, and whether or not these pieces of equipment are fitted correctly to the individual athlete to ensure that they are each preventing injury as well as possible. Other extrinsic factors are the conditions of the sports setting such as rain, snow, and maintenance of the floor/field of playing surface.

== Prevention ==
Prevention helps reduce potential sports injuries. Benefits include a healthier athlete, longer duration of participation in the sport, potential for better performance, and reduced medical costs. Explaining the benefits of sports injury prevention programs to coaches, team trainers, sports teams, and individual athletes will give them a glimpse at the likelihood for success by having the athletes feel they are healthy, strong, comfortable, and capable to compete. Better training and better exercises can help prevent injuries from even happening.

=== Primary, secondary, and tertiary prevention ===
Prevention can be broken up into three broad categories primary, secondary, and tertiary prevention. Primary prevention involves the avoidance of injury. An example is ankle brace being worn as a team. Even those with no history of previous ankle injuries participate in wearing braces. If primary prevention activities were effective, there would be a lesser chance of injuries occurring in the first place. Secondary prevention involves an early diagnosis and treatment once an injury has occurred. The goal of early diagnosis is to ensure that the injury is receiving proper care and recovering correctly, thereby limiting the concern for other medical problems stemming from the initial traumatic event.

Some sports leagues have gone further in terms of secondary prevention by incorporating live sensing data to allow early diagnosis and treatment: Some teams in the Swiss National Ice Hockey League are testing out systems that combine helmet-integrated sensors and analysis software to reveal a player's ongoing brain injury risk during a game. These sensors provide players and coaches with real-time data on head impact strength, frequency, and severity. The sensors are planned to be integrated into the foam padding used inside hockey helmets to serve as pressure detectors.

Lastly, tertiary prevention is solely focused on rehabilitation to reduce and correct an existing disability resulting from the traumatic event. Thus, for an athlete with an ankle injury, rehabilitation would consist of balance exercises to recover strength and mobility, as well as wearing an ankle brace while gradually returning to the sport.

=== Season analysis ===
It is most essential to establish participation in warm-ups, stretching, and exercises that focus on main muscle groups commonly used in the sport of interest. This decreases the chances of getting muscle cramps, torn muscles, and stress fractures. A season analysis is an attempt to identify risks before they occur by reviewing training methods, the competition schedule, traveling, and past injuries. If injuries have occurred in the past, the season analysis reviews the injury and looks for patterns that may be related to a specific training event or competition program. For example, a stress fracture injury on a soccer team or cross country team may be correlated to a simultaneous increase in running and a change in running environment, like a transition from a soft to hard running surface. A season analysis can be documented as team-based results or individual athlete results. Other key program events that have been correlated to injury incidence are changes in training volume, changes in climate locations, selection for playing time in important matches, and poor sleep due to tight chaotic scheduling. It is important for team program directors and staff to implicate testing to ensure healthy, competitive, and confident athletes for their upcoming season.

=== Preseason screening ===
Another beneficial review for preventing player sports injuries is preseason screenings. A study found that the highest injury rate during practices across fifteen Division I, II, and III NCAA sports was in the preseason compared to in-season or postseason. To prepare an athlete for the wide range of activities needed to partake in their sport pre-participation examinations are regularly completed on hundreds of thousands of athletes each year. The physical exam must be done properly to limit the risks of injury and also to diagnose early onsets of a possible injury. Preseason screenings consist of testing the mobility of joints (ankles, wrists, hips, etc.), testing the stability of joints (knees, neck, etc.), testing the strength and power of muscles, and also testing breathing patterns. The objective of a preseason screening is to clear the athlete for participation and verify that there is no sign of injury or illness, which would represent a potential medical risk to the athlete (and a risk of liability to the sports organization). Besides the physical examination and the fluidity of the movements of joints the preseason screenings often take into account a nutrition aspect as well. It is important to maintain normal iron levels, blood pressure levels, fluid balance, adequate total energy intake, and normal glycogen levels. Nutrition can aid in injury prevention and rehabilitation if one obtains the body's daily intake needs. Obtaining sufficient amounts of calories, carbohydrates, fluids, protein, and vitamins and minerals is important for the overall health of the athlete and limits the risk of possible injuries. Iron deficiency, for example, is found in both male and female athletes; however 60 percent of female college athletes are affected by iron deficiency. There are many factors that can contribute to the loss of iron, like menstruation, gastrointestinal bleeding, inadequate iron intake from the diet, general fatigue, and weakness, among others. The consequences of iron deficiency, if not solved, can be impaired athletic performance and a decline in immune and cognitive function.

==== Functional movement screen ====
One technique used in the process of preseason screening is the functional movement screen (FMS). Functional movement screening is an assessment used to evaluate movement patterns and asymmetries, which can provide insight into mechanical restrictions and potential risk for injury. Functional movement screening contains seven fundamental movement patterns that require a balance of both mobility and stability. These fundamental movement patterns provide an observable performance of basic locomotor, manipulative, and stabilizing movements. The tests place the individual athlete in extreme positions where weaknesses and imbalances become clear if proper stability and mobility are not functioning correctly. The seven fundamental movement patterns are a deep squat, hurdle step, in-line lunge, shoulder mobility, active straight-leg raise, trunk stability push-up, and rotary stability. For example, the deep squat is a test that challenges total body mechanics. It is used to gauge bilateral, symmetrical, and functional mobility of the hips, knees, and ankles. The dowel held overhead gauges bilateral and symmetrical mobility of the shoulders and the thoracic spine. The ability to perform the deep squat technique requires appropriate pelvic rhythm, closed-kinetic chain dorsiflexion of the ankles, flexion of the knees and hips, extension of the thoracic spine, as well as flexion and abduction of the shoulders. There is a scoring system applied to each movement as follows a score of 3 is given to the athlete if they can perform the movement without any compensations, a score of 2 is given to the athlete if they can perform the movement, but operate on poor mechanics and compensatory patterns to achieve the movement, a score of 1 is given to the athlete if they cannot perform the movement pattern even with compensations, and finally, a 0 is given to the athlete if one has pain during any part of the movement or test. Three of the seven fundamental tests including shoulder mobility, trunk stability push-up, and rotary stability have a clearance score associated with them meaning a pass or fail score. If the athlete fails this part of the test a score of 0 is given as the overall score. Once the scoring is complete the athlete and medical professional can review the documentation together and organize a set prevention program to help target and strengthen the areas of weakness to limit the risks of possible injuries.

== Sport injury prevention for children ==
There are approximately 8,000 children treated in emergency rooms each day for sports-related injuries. It is estimated that around 1.35 million children will have a sports-related injury per year, worldwide. This is why children and adolescents need special attention and care when participating in sports.

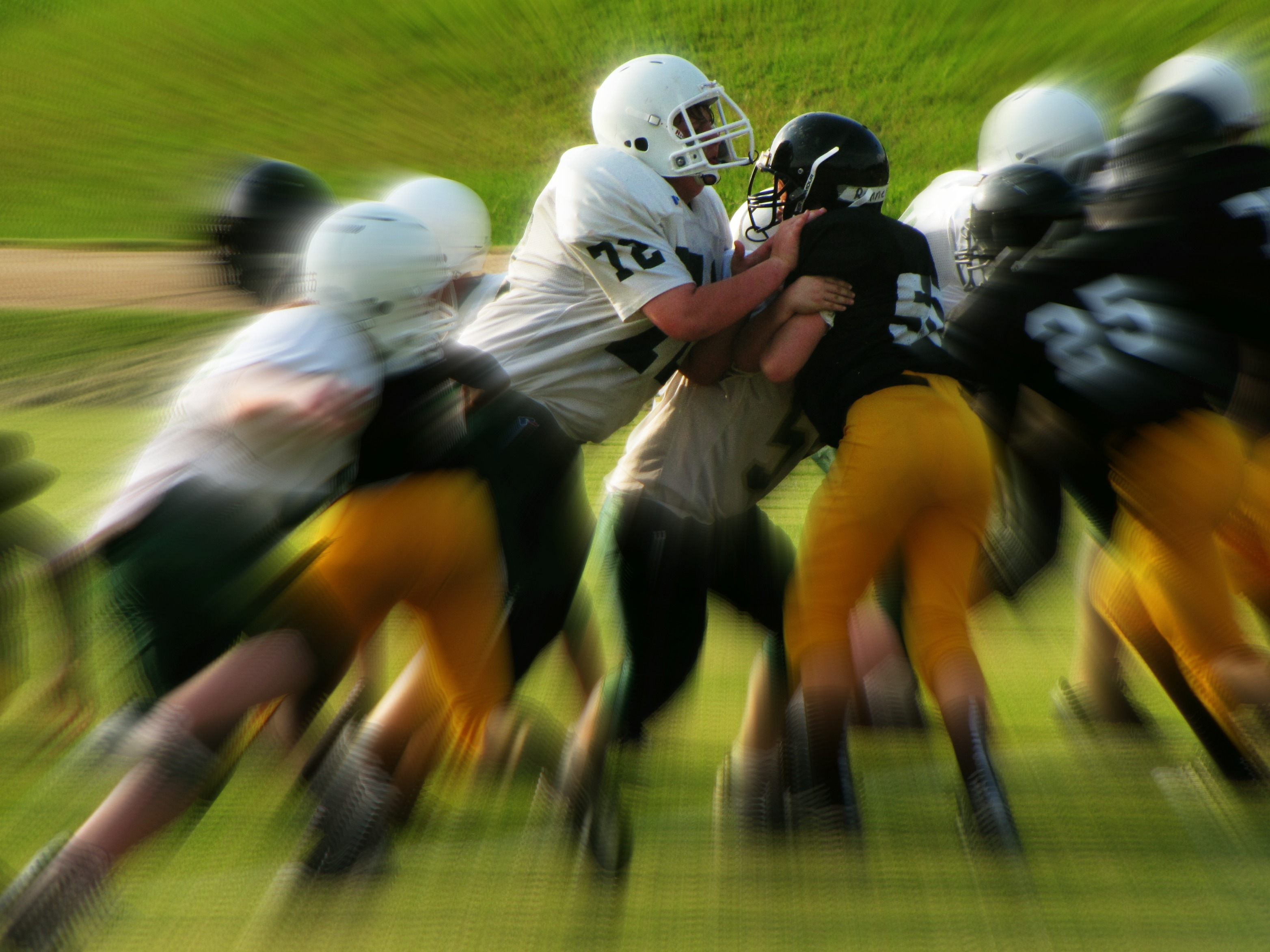
Youths can be easily injured playing contact sports like football. Proper equipment such as helmets and pads can be helpful in prevention.

According to the Centers for Disease Control and Prevention (CDC), many sports-related injuries are predictable and preventable. Some prevention techniques are listed below.

- Exercise-based injury prevention has been shown to reduce injury rates in sports. Sport-specific warm-up programs exist which have proven efficacious in reducing injuries of children.
- Warming up before sport improves the blood flow in muscles and allows for the muscle temperature to rise which helps to prevent muscle strains or tears.
- Provide children with the right well-fitting equipment for sports like helmets, shin guards, ankle braces, gloves, and others to prevent injuries.
- Have breaks and drink water as well to keep them hydrated.

== Sports injury prevalence ==
The prevalence of sports injuries is difficult to define, due to the variety of sports that individuals participate in and based on severity, those not treated versus those requiring urgent treatment. As such, incidence as a function of injury per 1,000 hours of activity participation has been adopted to aid in comparison of injury types, and across different sports and groups of people.

Sports that have a higher incidence of contact and collision have the highest rates of injury. Collisions with the ground, objects, and other players are common, and unexpected dynamic forces on limbs and joints can cause sports injuries. Soccer is the sport leading to the most competitive injuries in NCAA female college athletes. Gymnastics, on the other hand, has the highest injury rate overall. Swimming and diving is the NCAA sport that has the lowest injury rates. Injury rates were much higher for NCAA women's sports during competitions rather than practices except for volleyball, indoor track, and swimming and diving. For eight of the NCAA sports, many injuries acquired during competition require at least seven days recovery before returning to the sport. In general, more females are injured during practice than in competition. NCAA athlete injury rates are higher in men's ice hockey, basketball, and lacrosse. NCAA athlete injury rates were significantly higher in women's cross country than men's cross country. The NCAA injury rates are roughly the same for soccer, swimming and diving, tennis, and both indoor and outdoor track and field, regardless of gender.

== Costs ==
Interventions targeted at decreasing the incidence of sports injuries can impact healthcare costs, as well as family and societal resources. Sports injuries have direct and indirect costs. The direct costs are usually calculated by taking into account the cost of using healthcare resources to prevent, detect, and treat injury. There is a need for research about how healthcare is used and the expenses that coincide with it. Included in these expenses are how different injuries may have different prognoses. Indirect costs may be taken into account as well, when an injury prevents an individual from returning to work it may hinder the economic benefit to themselves and others.

For collegiate athletics, the estimated cost of sports injuries ranges from $446 million to $1.5 billion per year. For high school athletics, the yearly estimated cost of sport injuries ranges from $5.4 billion to $19.2 billion. Medical costs in the United States for sports injury-related emergency department visits exceeded $935 million every year.

== Sports-related emotional stress ==
Sports involvement can initiate both physical and mental demands on athletes. Athletes must learn ways to cope with stressors and frustrations that can arise from competition against others. Conducted research shows that levels of anxiety, stress, and depression are elevated following sports injuries. After an occurrence of an injury many athletes display self-esteem issues, athletic identity crises, and high levels of post-traumatic distress, which are linked to avoidant coping skills.

Each year in the United States, 3.5 million athletes are injured; therefore, it is important to understand how injury can impact anxiety. Athletes are exposed to a culture that focuses heavily on success, and injuries can hinder the athlete from reaching their full potential. Because of this reliance on achievement, many players are unlikely to stop performing because of pain they face. An injury could not only impact an athlete's ability to train and compete but also influence their psyche and mental health. The external pressure by coaches, teammates, fans, and the media on athletes to endure pain and injury instead of refusing to play when hurt has prompted athletes to believe that accepting physical risks is their only choice. This will in turn lead to both physical and mental struggles for the athlete to endure simultaneously and could lead to a worse outcome if not treated appropriately.

In addition, the influences of personal and situational factors can directly impact an athlete's perceptions about their injury. Personal factors include the characteristics of the injury, the athlete's approach to their injury, and their identity. Situational factors include the nature of the athlete's sport, social influences, and the rehabilitation environment. For example, stressful events such as divorce or employment instability can increase the likelihood of experiencing an injury. An athlete's response to an injury is influenced by a variety of stressors they encountered before the injury and the coping skills they used to overcome previous struggles. Therefore, it is important to utilize an integrated model in the rehabilitation process to account for the cognitive, emotional, and behavioral needs of the athletes.

In the rehabilitation process, athletes may experience anxiety as a result of the injury as well as their underlying personal and situational issues. As mental trainer Jeff Troesch mentions, "Recovering from injury can be one of the toughest psychological challenges any athlete faces." All of the uncertainty surrounding the injury and lacking full control over one's body can lead to more anxiety and stress on the athlete. Studies have shown that higher anxiety scores are commonly associated with other comorbidities including depression. In addition, athletes with higher ratings for career dissatisfaction also exhibited higher anxiety scores compared to those who were career satisfied with their career. From these studies it can be inferred that injured athletes experience an increase in anxiety levels as a result of psychosocial factors. Hence, taking these influences into account may assist sports medicine practitioners when planning for the psychological management needs of injured elite athletes.

When addressing psychological readiness during the recovery process, rehabilitation facilities should encourage confidence-building and provide social support to the athletes. Developing confidence in returning to sport includes "having trust in the rehabilitation provider, satisfaction of social support needs, and achievement of physical standards/clinical outcomes." Social support can operate as a buffer for the amount of anxiety and stress associated with an injury by positively affecting the athlete's psychological and emotional wellbeing. In turn, this support can improve the athlete's motivation and coping skills during the rehabilitation process. In addition, research suggests that emotional social support, which prioritizes "empathy, love, trust, and caring" can benefit injured athletes psychologically as they recover. With greater emphasis on the psyche, athletes will be more motivated to envision their injury recovery as a new competition or task, rather than a roadblock that hinders them from achieving their dreams.

To accommodate psychosocial factors in recovery, services must be accessible to the athletes. Although many universities provide psychological services to their students, these employees may not be trained in handling athlete-specific factors, and thus may not be able to address the particular needs of injured athletes. Therefore, certified athletic trainers who work with athletes consistently can be an important resource for providing emotional and social support to injured athletes. In previous studies, athletes who were content with the social support they received from their athletic trainers were 87% less likely to report symptoms of depression and anxiety. Thus, such athletic trainers involved in the athlete's regular activities can be effective in facilitating psychological interventions during the rehabilitation process.

Currently, mental health struggles are often surrounded by stigma and can be seen as a weakness for high-level athletes. When discussing Kara Goucher's openness to sharing her difficulty with negative self-talk and confidence, the author acknowledged that this example is rare in the world of athletics because such struggles are usually considered a weakness. If more athletes like Kara Goucher communicate about their mental health, others will feel more inclined to discuss their issues instead of keeping it to themselves. Therefore, de-stigmatizing and engaging in conversations about mental health can encourage athletes to enlist help for their internal struggles throughout their sports career and during an injury. Mindfulness-based interventions that integrate the mind and body have begun to address mental health needs among high-level athletes. Not only has mindfulness been shown to positively impact general well-being and improve performance, but it could also be utilized as a "protective factor to stress and stress-related psychological issues." The stigma associated with mental health as a weakness is a common barrier impeding help-seeking behaviors for athletes whose primary goal is to achieve perfection and success in their sport.

Elite athletes dedicate an immense amount of time and effort. They can face both physical and mental roadblocks. Therefore, rehabilitation programs must account for mental health as a strong component of the recovery process, so that they are better prepared to manage not only the physical burden but also the psychological effects of their injury. Understanding the injured athlete's experience from a physical, psychological, and social perspective is essential for them to return to their sport when they are both physically and mentally prepared to perform at their optimal level.

Many student-athletes do not seek mental health support. Research suggests that only 10% of college athletes with mental health conditions seek support. This means that out of approximately 500,000 college athletes, only 50,000 seek help. Awareness is another challenge of support. In a survey evaluating mental health support for college athletes, 60% of male athletes and 55% of female athletes were not aware of how to find or access mental health support.

== See also ==
- Baseball injury list
- Doping in sport
- Health issues in athletics
- Health issues in youth sports
- Injured reserve list
- Orchard Sports Injury and Illness Classification System (OSIICS)
- PLAC Injury
- Physical injuries in Yoga
- Squatting position
