= Skeletal muscle cramp =

Pathological, often painful, involuntary muscle contraction

Cramp
- Other names: Muscle cramp, charley horse
- Symptoms: Sudden muscle pain and a paralysis-like immobility
- Treatment: Stretching, massage, and drinking liquids

A cramp is a sudden, involuntary, painful contraction of one or more skeletal muscles, or an overshortening of such associated with electrical activity. While generally temporary and non-damaging, they can cause significant pain and a paralysis-like immobility of the affected muscle. A cramp usually goes away on its own over several seconds or (sometimes) minutes. Cramps are common and tend to occur at rest, usually at night (nocturnal leg cramps). They are also often associated with pregnancy, physical exercise or overexertion, and age (common in older adults); in such cases, cramps are called idiopathic because there is no underlying pathology. In addition to those benign conditions, cramps are also associated with many pathological conditions.

The definition of a cramp is narrower than that of a muscle spasm: spasms include any involuntary abnormal muscle contractions, while cramps are sustained and painful. True cramps can be distinguished from other cramp-like conditions. Cramps are different from muscle contracture, which is also painful and involuntary, but which is electrically silent. The main distinguishing features of cramps from dystonia are suddenness with acute onset of pain, involvement of only one muscle, and spontaneous resolution of cramps or their resolution after stretching the affected muscle. Restless leg syndrome is not considered the same as muscle cramps and should not be confused with rest cramps. Cramps are sometimes also called a "Charley horse", which is a lay term used by people in the United States.

Under normal circumstances, skeletal muscles can be voluntarily controlled, and any of them can be affected by cramps. Skeletal muscles that are most often affected by cramps are the calves, thighs, and arches of the foot.

Gentle stretching and massage, putting some pressure on the affected leg by walking or standing, or taking a warm bath or shower may help to end the cramp. If the cramp is in the calf muscle, dorsiflexing the foot (lifting the toes back toward the shins) will stretch the muscle and provide almost immediate relief. There is limited evidence supporting the use of magnesium, calcium channel blockers, carisoprodol, and vitamin B_{12}.

== Causes ==
Skeletal muscle cramps may be caused by muscle fatigue or a lack of electrolytes such as sodium (a condition called hyponatremia), potassium (called hypokalemia), or magnesium (called hypomagnesemia). Some skeletal muscle cramps do not have a known cause. Motor neuron disorders (e.g., amyotrophic lateral sclerosis), metabolic disorders (e.g., liver failure), some medications (e.g., diuretics and inhaled beta‐agonists), and haemodialysis may also cause muscle cramps.

Causes of cramping include hyperflexion, hypoxia, exposure to large changes in temperature, dehydration, or low blood salt. Muscle cramps can also be a symptom or complication of pregnancy; kidney disease; thyroid disease; hypokalemia, hypomagnesemia, or hypocalcaemia (as conditions); restless legs syndrome; varicose veins; and multiple sclerosis.

As early as 1965, researchers observed that leg cramps and restless legs syndrome can result from excess insulin, sometimes called hyperinsulinemia.

=== Nocturnal leg cramps ===
Leg cramps might occur during the night or less commonly while resting. These are involuntary muscle contractions that occur in the calves, soles of the feet, or other muscles in the body. The duration is variable, with cramps lasting anywhere from a few seconds to several minutes. Muscle soreness may remain after the cramp itself ends. These cramps are more common in older people. They happen quite frequently in teenagers and some people while exercising at night. Besides being painful, a nocturnal leg cramp can cause much distress and anxiety. The precise cause of these cramps is unclear. Potential contributing factors include dehydration, low levels of certain minerals (magnesium, potassium, calcium, and sodium, although the evidence has been mixed), and reduced blood flow through muscles attendant in prolonged sitting or lying down. Nocturnal leg cramps (almost exclusively calf cramps) are considered "normal" during the late stages of pregnancy.

A lactic acid buildup around muscles can trigger cramps; however, they happen during anaerobic respiration when a person is exercising or engaging in an activity where the heartbeat rises. Medical conditions associated with leg cramps are cardiovascular disease, hemodialysis, cirrhosis, pregnancy, and lumbar canal stenosis. Differential diagnoses include restless legs syndrome, claudication, myositis, and peripheral neuropathy. All of them can be differentiated through careful history and physical examination.

=== Treatment induced ===
Various medications may cause nocturnal leg cramps:

- Diuretics, especially potassium-sparing
- Intravenous (IV) iron sucrose
- Conjugated estrogens
- Teriparatide
- Naproxen
- Raloxifene
- Long-acting adrenergic beta-agonists (LABAs)
- Hydroxymethylglutaryl-coenzyme A reductase inhibitors (HMG-CoA inhibitors or statins)

Statins may sometimes cause myalgia and cramps among other possible side effects. Raloxifene (Evista) is a medication associated with a high incidence of leg cramps. Additional factors, that increase the probability of these side effects, are physical exercise, age, history of cramps, and hypothyroidism. Up to 80% of athletes using statins experience significant adverse muscular effects, including cramps; the rate appears to be approximately 10–25% in a typical statin-using population. In some cases, adverse effects disappear after switching to a different statin; however, they should not be ignored if they persist, as they can, in rare cases, develop into more serious problems. Coenzyme Q10 supplementation can help avoid some statin-related adverse effects, but currently, there is not enough evidence to prove its effectiveness in avoiding myopathy or myalgia.

== Treatment ==
Stretching, massage, and drinking plenty of liquids may help treat simple muscle cramps.

=== Medication ===
While quinine was a traditional treatment for nocturnal leg cramps, it is no longer recommended due to potential fatal hypersensitivity reactions and thrombocytopenia. Arrhythmias, cinchonism, and hemolytic uremic syndrome can also occur at higher dosages.

Magnesium is commonly used to treat muscle cramps. Moderate-quality evidence indicates that magnesium is not effective for treating or preventing cramps in older adults. It is not known if magnesium helps with cramps due to pregnancy, liver cirrhosis, other medical conditions, or exercise. Oral magnesium treatment does not appear to have significant major side effects, however, it may be associated with diarrhea and nausea in 11–37% of people who use this medicine.

With exertional heat cramps due to electrolyte abnormalities (primarily potassium loss and not calcium, magnesium, and sodium), appropriate fluids and sufficient potassium improve symptoms. Vitamin B complex, naftidrofuryl, lidocaine, and calcium channel blockers may be effective for muscle cramps.

== Prevention ==
Adequate conditioning, stretching, mental preparation, hydration, and electrolyte balance are likely helpful in preventing muscle cramps.

== See also ==
- Spasm
- Writer's cramp
