= WALANT =

Medical technique

WALANT (Wide Awake Local Anesthesia No Tourniquet) is a technique that uses local anesthesia and hemostatic agent (e.g., 1% lidocaine with 1:100,000 epinephrine, sometimes buffered with sodium bicarbonate) in hand surgery in unsedated patients. The absence of a tourniquet avoids tourniquet-related discomfort and complications, while the use of epinephrine provides vasoconstriction, resulting in a decreased blood loss that is suitable for most hand procedures. It is a safe, cost-effective, efficient, and widely accessible approach with a low complication rate. The technique allows the patient to remain fully awake and utilize active movement, which allows for intraoperative assessment of tendon function, fracture stability, or nerve decompression. Its exclusion of general anesthesia allows it to be done in an office or outpatient setting, which eliminates the need for operating room resources, anesthesia personnel, and post-anesthesia care units.

== History ==
Canadian plastic hand surgeon Donald H. Lalonde first published this method in 2003 to decrease surgical wait times; he formally proposed the concept in 2005, which has been internationalized since. The WALANT technique has also been increasingly popular during the COVID-19 pandemic because it shifted away from the need for general anesthesia and operating room personnel while being resource-efficient.

== Technique ==
A local anesthetic solution, most commonly lidocaine 1% with epinephrine 1:100,000 buffered with sodium bicarbonate is injected under the skin and into deeper tissues at the planned incision site. Sodium bicarbonate is thought to decrease pain during injection and quicken anesthesia onset. Bupivacaine 0.25-0.5% can be added optionally to provide extended postoperative analgesia. Phentolamine can reverse the effects of epinephrine should digital ischemia present itself.

=== Indications ===
Indications for the WALANT technique include most elective and trauma-related procedures of the hand and fingers, such as carpal tunnel release, trigger finger release, tendon repair, nerve decompression, excision of masses (e.g., ganglion cyst), and fracture fixation. It allows for intraoperative active mobilization for flexor tendon repairs and tenolysis, fracture fixation of metacarpal and phalangeal bones, trigger finger release, and tendon transfers.

=== Contraindications ===
Contraindications are primarily related to patient factors and local tissue status. Absolute contraindications include known allergy to local anesthetic agents or epinephrine, active infection at injection site, and severe peripheral vascular disease. Relative contraindications include poorly controlled anxiety and inability to cooperate during the procedure, which can be seen in certain pediatric or cognitively impaired patients. However, recent literature demonstrates that those with preexisting anxiety report high satisfaction with WALANT when appropriate counseling and supportive measures are provided, which can include music, virtual reality, or active conversation.

== Complications ==
A 2024 systematic review and meta-analysis demonstrates an overall complication rate of approximately 1.7% in upper limb procedures. The most common complications include superficial infection (51%), recurrent disease (6.7%) , and other minor issues like hematoma.

Transient digital ischemia can occur with epinephrine, but these cases are typically short-lived and reversible, leading to no long-term sequelae. If persistent, phentolamine is recommended as a reversal agent.

Cardiac arrhythmias are not increased in WALANT. Minor arrhythmias (e.g., sinus tachycardia, asymptomatic bradyarrhythmias) may occur but do not require intervention.
