= Paratenonitis =

Tendon rubbing over a bony surface

Paratenonitis occurs where a tendon rubs over a bony surface. It is presented with acute edema and hyperaemia of the paratenon with infiltration of inflammatory cells. After few hours or few days, tendon sheath is filled by fibrinous exudate and leads to crepitus. In chronic paratenonitis fibroblasts appear along with perivascular lymphocytic infiltrate. Peritendinous tissues become macroscopically thickened and new connective tissue adhesions occur. In paratenonitis, inflammatory cells are found in the cellular elements of the paratenon and in the vascular ingrowth.
