= Exercise-associated muscle cramps =

Type of painful muscle spasm

Exercise-associated muscle cramps (EAMC) are defined as cramping (painful muscle spasms) during or immediately following exercise. Muscle cramps during exercise are very common, even in elite athletes. EAMC are a common condition that occurs during or after exercise, often during endurance events such as a triathlon or marathon. Although EAMC are extremely common among athletes, the cause is still not fully understood because muscle cramping can occur as a result of many underlying conditions. Elite athletes experience cramping due to paces at higher intensities. The cause of exercise-associated muscle cramps is hypothesized to be due to altered neuromuscular control, dehydration, or electrolyte depletion.

== Electrolyte depletion and dehydration theory ==
It is widely believed that excessive sweating due to strenuous exercise can lead to muscle cramps. Deficiency of sodium and other electrolytes may lead to contracted interstitial fluid compartments, which may exacerbate the muscle cramping. According to this theory, the increased blood plasma osmolality from sweating sodium losses causes a fluid shift from the interstitial space to the intervascular space, which causes the interstitial fluid compartment to deform and contributes to muscle hyperexcitability and risk of spontaneous muscle activity.

== Neuromuscular control ==
The second hypothesis is altered neuromuscular control. In this hypothesis, it is suggested that cramping is due to altered neuromuscular activity. The proposed underlying cause of the altered neuromuscular control is due to fatigue. There are several disturbances, at various levels of the central and peripheral nervous system, and the skeletal muscle that contribute to cramping. These disturbances can be described by a series of several key events. First and foremost, repetitive muscle exercise can lead to the development of fatigue due to one or more of the following: inadequate conditioning, hot and or humid environments, increased intensity, increased duration, and decreased supply of energy. Muscle fatigue itself causes increased excitatory afferent activity within the muscle spindles and decreased inhibitory afferent activity within the Golgi tendon. The coupling of these events leads to altered neuromuscular control from the spinal cord. A cascade of events follow the altered neuromuscular control; this includes increased alpha-motor neuron activity in the spinal cord, which overloads the lower motor neurons, and increased muscle cell membrane activity. Thus, the resultant of this cascade is a muscle cramp.

== Treatment and prevention ==
Medication has not been found to help reduce or prevent muscle cramping. To prevent or treat, athletes are recommended to stretch, stop movement and rest, massaging the area that is cramping, or drink fluids. Stretching helps to calm down spindles by lengthening the muscle fibers and increase firing duration to slow down the firing rate of the muscle. Recommended fluids during cramping are water or fluids that are high in electrolytes to replenish the system with sodium.
