= Acral persistent papular mucinosis =

- Other names: APPM
- Specialty: Dermatology
- Differential diagnosis: Discrete papular lichen myxoedematosus, Cutaneous papular mucinosis of infancy, Nodular lichen myxoedematosus.
- Treatment: Topical and intralesional corticosteroids.
- Frequency: Around 40 cases as of 2021.

Acral persistent papular mucinosis (APPM) is a rare form of lichen myxedematosus. It is characterized by small papules on the backs of the hands, wrists, and extensor aspects of the distal forearms, with no further clinical or laboratory indications. Lesions tend to persist and may grow in number gradually. Because there are no symptoms, treatment is rarely required.

== Signs and symptoms ==
Acral persistent papular mucinosis is a chronic idiopathic cutaneous mucinosis with the following characteristics:

1. Papules, nodules, and/or plaques of lichenoid origin
2. Mucin deposition in conjunction with varying degrees of dermal fibrosis and fibroblast proliferation
3. The absence of thyroid disease.

== Causes ==
The cause of Acral persistent papular mucinosis is unknown, but genetic and environmental factors appear to play a role, as familial cases have been reported. TNF-α and TGF-β have been proposed to stimulate glycosaminoglycan synthesis, however, the exact triggers are unknown.

== Diagnosis ==
Histologically, hematoxylin-eosin and Alcian blue staining show mucin accumulation in the upper reticular dermis, as well as collagen fiber separation due to hyaluronic acid deposition. Mucin accumulation may result in epidermis thinning. Fibroblast proliferation is sometimes increased.

=== Differential diagnosis ===
In addition to various forms of mucinosis, the differential diagnosis includes a range of papular diseases such as granuloma annulare, molluscum contagiosum, acrokeratoelastoidosis, lichen amyloidosis, lichen planus, and eruptive collagenoma. The exact positions of the lesions and findings on histopathology using alcian blue stain aid in the diagnosis. APPM should be distinguished from the discrete papular form of lichen myxedematosus (DPLM), which is considered another subtype of lichen myxedematosus. Papules in DPLM can affect any part of the body, typically in an asymmetrical pattern. Histologically, DPLM has more diffuse and interstitial mucin deposition in the upper to mid dermis, at times with increased fibroblasts.

One may also take into consideration self-healing juvenile cutaneous mucinosis (SHJCM). In contrast, SHJCM is typified by an acute popular eruption that can combine to form linear infiltrated plaques on the face, neck, scalp, abdomen, and/or thighs. In addition, SHJCM is linked to fever, arthralgia, weakness, and tenderness in the muscles in children. Mucinous subcutaneous nodules on the face, sometimes associated with periorbital swelling, and on the periarticular areas are prominent features. A papule exhibits mucin dermal deposition with a perivascular inflammatory infiltrate, whereas nodules exhibit fibroblastic reactive proliferation that involves the subcutaneous fat, akin to nodular or proliferative fasciitis, with mucin deposited throughout the dermis and subcutis. Usually, spontaneous resolution happens in a few weeks to several months.

Finally, the most important differential diagnosis is scleromyxedema. Localized lichen myxedematosus and scleromyxedema were once thought to be the same disease, but they are actually part of a spectrum in the context of primary cutaneous mucinoses. Clinical, histologic, and laboratory findings can help differentiate between the two disorders. Clinically, scleromyxedema tends to be diffuse and sclerodermoid, with systemic manifestations similar to scleroderma. Scleromyxedema's classic histopathologic findings are a microscopic triad of mucin deposition, fibroblast proliferation, and fibrosis, or, in rare cases, an interstitial granuloma annulare-like pattern. Scleromyxedema, unlike APPM, occurs in association with monoclonal gammopathy and can have a wide range of systemic manifestations, including neurologic, rheumatologic, pulmonary, and cardiovascular indications.

== Treatment ==
There are few therapeutic options however, no specific treatment exists. Treatment is not always necessary, and APPM is mostly a cosmetic issue. Treatment with topical or intralesional steroids and topical calcineurin inhibitors has been reported anecdotally. Other interventions with variable results include dermabrasion, electrosurgery, carbon dioxide laser, and erbium-YAG (yttrium aluminum garnet) laser. The latter has the potential to leave scars. The course is benign, though spontaneous resolution is rare. Often, the number of papules increases gradually over time.

== Epidemiology ==
Acral persistent papular mucinosis has a strong female predominance. the mean age at onset is 48 years and reported patients have ranged from 14 years old to 84. The mean duration of the disease 5.6 years, ranging from 6 months to years. The majority of cases have been reported in Europe, particularly in Spain and Italy, but there have also been cases reported in North and South America and Southeast Asia. It is unknown why the majority of cases come from Europe, but it could be that the disease is more commonly recognized in Western countries.

== History ==
Rongioletti et al. described acral persistent papular mucinosis in 1986 as one of the five types of lichen myxedematosus.

== See also ==
- Papular mucinosis
- Localized lichen myxedematosus
