= Lichen myxedematosus =

- Specialty: Dermatology

Lichen myxedematous is a group of cutaneous disorders considered mucinoses. Conditions included in this group are:

- Generalized lichen myxedematosus
- Localized lichen myxedematosus

- Discrete papular lichen myxedematosus
- Acral persistent papular mucinosis
- Self-healing papular mucinosis

- Self-healing juvenile cutaneous mucinosis

- Papular mucinosis of infancy
- Atypical lichen myxedematosus
- Atypical tuberous myxedema

== See also ==
- List of cutaneous conditions
