= Hyaluronan synthase =

Class of enzymes

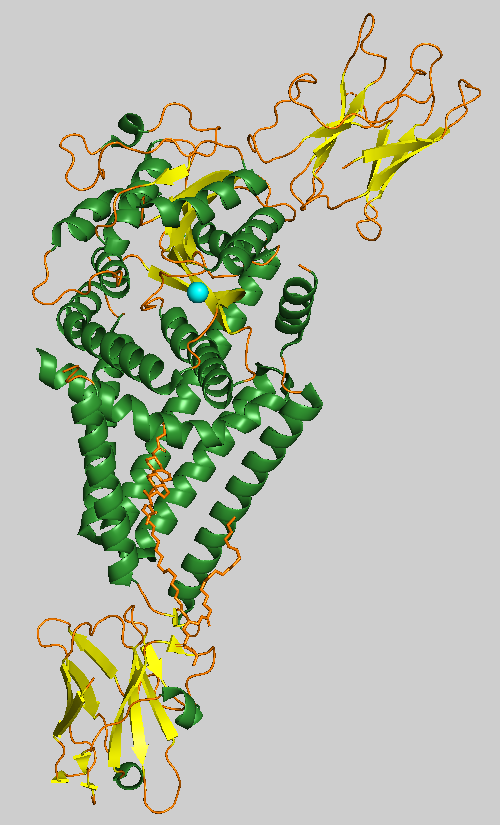
- Chlorella virus hyaluronan synthase with the manganese ion shown as a cyan sphere.

Identifiers
- EC no.: 2.4.1.212
- CAS no.: 39346-43-5

Databases
- IntEnz: IntEnz view
- BRENDA: BRENDA entry
- ExPASy: NiceZyme view
- KEGG: KEGG entry
- MetaCyc: metabolic pathway
- PRIAM: profile
- PDB structures: RCSB PDB PDBe PDBsum
Search
- PMC: articles
- PubMed: articles
- NCBI: proteins

Hyaluronan synthases (HAS) are membrane-bound enzymes that use UDP-α-N-acetyl-D-glucosamine and UDP-α-D-glucuronate as substrates to produce the glycosaminoglycan hyaluronan at the cell surface and extrude it through the membrane into the extracellular space.

== Isoforms ==
There are three mammalian hyaluronan synthases described to date - HAS1, HAS2, and HAS3. Each of these isoforms resides at a different chromosome location and has been cloned. Two of the main differences between the isoforms are the chain length of the hyaluronan molecules that they produce and the ease with which they can be released from the cell surface. When mammalian cells are stimulated by changes in their immediate environment (cytokines, extracellular matrix proximities), the HAS isoforms respond differently and appear to be under different control mechanisms.

During the development of the embryo, each isoform is uniquely expressed, both spatially and temporally.

- HAS2 is probably the most important synthase at this time as mice lacking the ability to express HAS2 (knock-out mice) die at mid-gestation,
- HAS1 or HAS3 knock-out mice show no effect on foetal development.

The isoforms of HAS also display varying physiological effects and therapeutic potentials. HAS2 is overexpressed in breast cancer cell lines and is associated with lymph node metastasis, while HAS1 and HAS3 lack any correlations with cancer development or metastasis. HAS-2 has also been proposed as a nanotherapeutic agent to combat osteoarthritis in joints displaying synovial inflammation as a result of increased hyaluronan depolymerization. Contrastingly, stimulation of HAS3 has been linked to increased inflammation and atheroprogression by means of increased interleukin release and macrophage activation.

== Structure ==
HAS1 has a single catalytic domain and is embedded in the transmembrane channel to form glycosidic linkages in the production of hyaluronan (HA). It contains five transmembrane helices and three interface helices whose overall architecture resembles a tepee. The Pasteurella multocida bacterium isoform (pmHAS) contains 972 residues in which deletion of residues 1-117 does not affect enzyme activity, and the C-terminal of the active site resides around residues 686-703. Two catalytic residues exist in the catalytic domain; an aspartic acid to asparagine mutation at position 196 (D196N) leads to loss of GlcUA-transferase activity, and an aspartic acid to lysine mutation at position 477 (D477K) leads to loss of GlcNAc-transferase activity. Combination of both mutants leads to similar activity compared to the wild type. pmHAS additionally contains an Asp-Gly-Ser sequence that is conserved among beta-glycosyltransferases.

HAS2 is regulated by dimerization and ubiquitination. In COS-1 monkey kidney cells transfected with mouse HAS2 and HAS3 plasmids, one site of ubiquitination is seen on the lysine at residue 190. A K190R mutant formed a HAS2 dimer, and a flag-tagged and 6myc-tagged HAS2 and HAS3 showed the formation of both homo and heterodimers with each other. Chlorella virus HAS (Cv-HAS) share roughly 45% sequence similarity to human HAS2.

HAS3 is regulated through truncation of the 3'UTR end, which down-regulates NUDT21, a regulator for polyadenylation. The loss of this regulatory site in rodent models drives neoplastic processes, increased pro-remodeling phenotypes, and the elevation of HA synthesis, but also increases likelihood of pulmonary hypertension. HAS3 has a higher sequence identity to HAS2 (71%) compared to HAS1 (57%). HAS1, HAS2, and HAS3 have thirteen, fourteen, and fourteen cysteine residues, respectively, compared to S. pyogenes (spHAS) which contains six cysteine residues. A sulfhydryl poisoned cysteine at position 225 in spHAS inhibits enzyme activity, but it is uncertain whether the disulfide bonds yield a significant effect on the activity of the HAS enzymes. Hydropathy plots among the three isoforms HAS1, HAS2, and HAS3 suggest that each protein is organized in a similar manner in the membrane.

== Mechanism ==
Initiation of hyaluronan biosynthesis by Class I hyaluronan synthases involves in situ generation of an N-acetylglucosamine (GlcNAc) primer through hydrolysis of UDP-GlcNAc, followed by diffusion of the primer into the active site. The active site contains two distinct domains, each of which are capable of binding either the nascent UDP-hyaluronan chain or a UDP-sugar monomer. Chain elongation, beginning from the GlcNAc primer, occurs with sequential addition of alternating UDP-GlcA and UDP-GlcNAc units to the reducing end of the growing chain.

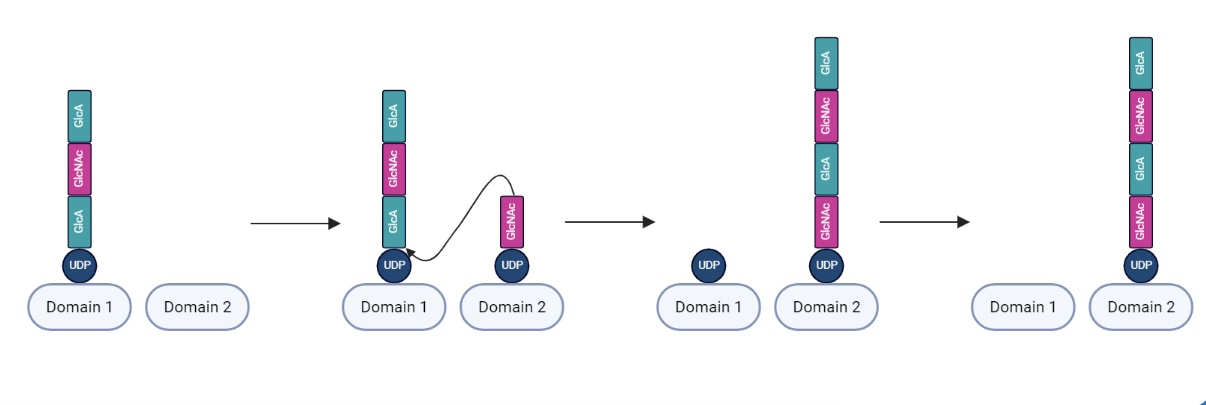
Diagram of the mechanism of hyaluronan synthase.

In each iteration of chain elongation, one active site domain is occupied by the existing UDP-hyaluronan chain. A UDP-sugar monomer corresponding to the next unit then binds to the unoccupied active site domain. Subsequently, a hydroxyl group on the bound UDP-sugar monomer performs a nucleophilic attack on the anomeric carbon of the reducing end monomer of the UDP-hyaluronan chain, displacing UDP from the hyaluronan chain and shifting the elongated chain to the domain previously occupied by the UDP-sugar monomer. Following this process, the displaced UDP dissociates from the other active site domain. The process of monomer binding and elongation then repeats, with alternating GlcA and GlcNAc units being added as the UDP-hyaluronan chain shifts from one active site domain to the other.

HAS1, HAS2, and HAS3 perform functionally equivalent hyaluronan biosyntheses but demonstrate differences in kinetic characteristics, including HAS1 demonstrating a higher Michaelis constant than HAS2 or HAS3. HAS kinetics and protein trafficking are also influenced by posttranslational and epigenetic modifications.

== Role in cancer metastasis ==
HAS can play roles in all of the stages of cancer metastasis. By producing anti-adhesive HA, HAS can allow tumor cells to release from the primary tumor mass and if HA associates with receptors such as CD44, the activation of Rho GTPases can promote EMT of the cancer cells. During the processes of intravasation or extravasation, the interaction of HAS produced HA with receptors such as CD44 or RHAMM promote the cell changes that allow for the cancer cells to infiltrate the vascular or lymphatic systems. While traveling in these systems, HA produced by HAS protects the cancer cell from physical damage. Finally, in the formation of a metastatic lesion, HAS produces HA to allow the cancer cell to interact with native cells at the secondary site and to produce a tumor for itself.

Increased HA production by cancer cells increases invasive capacity. HA's interaction with CD44 activates focal adhesion kinase (FAK), an important molecule in the process of cell motility by coordinating dissolution of the focal adhesions at the leading edge of the cell and formation at the lagging edge. Another signaling pathway activated by HA's interaction with CD44 is the Akt pathway which leads to expression of osteopontin, a molecule which can stimulate cell migration. The HA produced by HAS also has been suggested to protect the cancer cell from physical damage while in the circulatory or lymphatic systems. This role of HA has been shown in other cell types, but has not yet been researched in cancer cells. The HA produced by HAS up-regulates secretion of various MMPs, proteolytic enzymes that are involved in many stages of the metastatic cascade. Research has shown that the different HASs may impact the metastatic steps in different ways based on the molecular weight and amount of HA they produce.
