= Microbial hyaluronic acid production =

Microbial hyaluronic acid production refers to the process by which microorganisms, such as bacteria and yeast, are utilized in fermentation to synthesize hyaluronic acid (HA). HA is used in a wide range of medical, cosmetic, and biological products because of its high moisture retention and viscoelasticity qualities. HA had originally been extracted from rooster combs in limited quantities. However, challenges such as low yields, high production costs, and ethical issues associated with animal-derived HA has driven the development of microbial production methods for HA.

Although there are other methods for instance chemical synthesis and modification, chemoenzymatic synthesis, enzymatic synthesis; microbial fermentation has been preferred to produce HA because of economical advantages.

== Bacterial production ==
Some bacteria, such as Streptococcus, develop an extracellular capsule that contains HA. This capsule functions as a molecular mimic to elude the host's immune system during the infection process in addition to providing adherence and protection. Streptococcus zooepidemicus was used for first commercially HA fermentation, and that is most used bacteria since provides high yields although it is a pathogen microorganism.

Encoding of HA production is carried out by hasA, hasB, hasC, hasD and hasE genes in S. zooepidemicus.

Genes and their functions HA production in S. zooepidemicus
| Gene | Enzyme | Function | Reference |
|---|---|---|---|
| hasA | Hyaluronic acid synthase | HA synthesis and transport | |
| hasB | UDP-glucose dehydrogenase | UDP-GlcA biosynthesis | |
| hasC | UDP-glucose pyrophosphorylase | UDP-GlcA biosynthesis | |
| hasD | Acetyltransferase and pyrophosphorylase (bifunctional) | UDP-GlcNAc biosynthesis | |
| hasE | Phosphoglucoisomerase | UDP-GlcNAc biosynthesis | |

Genetically modified producers were developed such as Kluysveromyces lactis, Lactococcus lactis, Bacillus subtilis, Escherichia coli, and Corynebacterium glutamicum because of S. zooepidemicus's pathogeny.

== Biological process ==
=== Intracellular factors ===
==== Metabolism ====
Intermediates are used from pathways essential to support cell growth, such as the production of organic acids, polysaccharides during the HA production. HA is not an essential metabolite, and it competes other metabolites to attend the carbon flux in the cell. Reduction potential of S. zooepidemicus may have a role in hyaluronic acid production, because 2 NAD^{+} are consumed during the synthesis of one monomer. Although NAD^{+} does not control HA synthesis when NADH oxidase over-expressed, it has a big role in biomass formation.

Some studies showed that balanced intracellular concentration of precursors and their fluxes balanced provides higher molecular weight such as UDP-acetylglucosamine concentration. Enzymes such as hyaluronidase, β-glucuronidase of S. zooepidemicus decrease yield of HA. HA concentration is increased by deletion of associated genes of these enzymes.

On the other hand, some enzymes induce HA production such as sucrose-6-phosphatate hydrolase, and hyaluronan synthase. Using combined approaches with these two type enzymes is a good strategy for high yield HA production.

==== Membrane ====
HA is produced around the cell, serving as a barrier against the host immune system by the bacteria. Only 8% of HA remains as attached the cell when cells arrived stationary phase. Biosurfactants such as sodium dodecyl sulfate (SDS) are used to gain this product. Hyaluronan synthase, that is a membrane-binding enzyme, is one of the factors that reduces the production of HA. Hyaluronan synthase limits hyaluronic acid production by affecting cell morphology.

=== Environmental factors ===
==== pH ====
Organic acids formed during HA production by S. zooepidemicus cause pH to decrease Although HA production without pH control is cheaper, it prefers since provides high hyaluronic acid yields.

==== Temperature ====
HA production is affected regarding to yield and molecular weight by temperature. HA production increases while bacterial cells are growing above 37 °C. However, HA yield decreases while molecular weight is higher with fermentation under 32 °C.

==== Aeration ====
Although S. zooepidemicus is an aerotolerant anaerobe, hyaluronic acid production is affected by oxygen because NADH/NAD^{+} balance of cells changes with oxygen amount. Controlling oxygen during the cultivation via agitation rate provides increase both HA yield and molecular weight.

==== Culture Media Components ====
The carbon source is one of the media components that has effects on production of microbial HA. Although the glucose is most used one as a carbon source for the HA production; molasses, sucrose, and maltose are used for microbial production.

HA production needs also many amino acids in the culture media therefore nitrogen source concentration has a key.

== See also ==
- Hyaluronic acid
- Streptococcus zooepidemicus
