= Eccrine mucinosis =

- Specialty: Dermatology

Eccrine mucinosis is a cutaneous condition characterized by mucinosis, and described in HIV-infected patients.

== See also ==
- Perifollicular mucinosis
- List of cutaneous conditions
