= HABP4 =

Protein-coding gene in the species Homo sapiens

Identifiers
- Aliases: HABP4, IHABP-4, IKi-1/57, SERBP1L, hyaluronan binding protein 4
- External IDs: OMIM: 617369; MGI: 1891713; HomoloGene: 8615; GeneCards: HABP4; OMA:HABP4 - orthologs

Gene location (Human)
Chr.	Chromosome 9 (human)
Band	9q22.32	Start	96,450,169 bp
Band	9q22.32	End	96,491,336 bp

Gene location (Mouse)
Chr.	Chromosome 13 (mouse)
Band	13 B3|13 33.26 cM	Start	64,309,638 bp
Band	13 B3|13 33.26 cM	End	64,334,351 bp
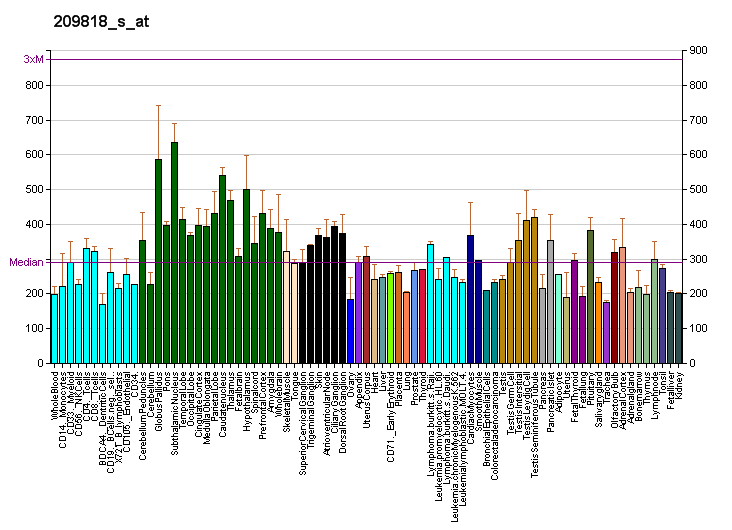
RNA expression pattern
Bgee	Human / Mouse (ortholog); Top expressed in: endothelial cell; nucleus accumbens; olfactory bulb; beta cell; putamen; right frontal lobe; caudate nucleus; cingulate gyrus; amygdala; anterior cingulate cortex / Top expressed in: superior frontal gyrus; dentate gyrus of hippocampal formation granule cell; primary visual cortex; central gray substance of midbrain; seminiferous tubule; medial vestibular nucleus; dorsal tegmental nucleus; neural layer of retina; right kidney; deep cerebellar nuclei; More reference expression data
BioGPS	More reference expression data
Gene ontology
Molecular function	protein binding; RNA binding; SUMO binding
Cellular component	extracellular region; sarcomere; nucleus; cytoplasm; nucleolus; Cajal body; sarcoplasm; nuclear body; nuclear speck; gemini of coiled bodies; cytosol; cytoplasmic stress granule
Biological process	negative regulation of DNA binding; cellular response to mechanical stimulus; platelet degranulation; regulation of transcription, DNA-templated; transcription, DNA-templated; positive regulation of RNA splicing; positive regulation of translational initiation; mRNA processing; regulation of translation; RNA splicing; PML body organization
Sources:Amigo / QuickGO
Orthologs
Species	Human	Mouse
Entrez	22927	56541
Ensembl	ENSG00000130956	ENSMUSG00000021476
UniProt	Q5JVS0	Q9JKS5
RefSeq (mRNA)	NM_014282	NM_019986
RefSeq (protein)	NP_055097	NP_064370
Location (UCSC)	Chr 9: 96.45 – 96.49 Mb	Chr 13: 64.31 – 64.33 Mb
PubMed search
- Wikidata
View/Edit Human	View/Edit Mouse

Intracellular hyaluronan-binding protein 4 is a protein that in humans is encoded by the HABP4 gene.
