= Self-healing papular mucinosis =

- Specialty: Dermatology

Self-healing papular mucinosis is a skin condition caused by fibroblasts producing abnormally large amounts of mucopolysaccharides, and may present in adult and juvenile forms. The juvenile variant is also called self-healing juvenile cutaneous mucinosis.

== See also ==
- Papular mucinosis
- List of cutaneous conditions
