= Sodium hyaluronate =

Chemical compound

Clinical data
- Trade names: Healon, Provisc, Viscoat, Hyalgan, Euflexxa, Supartz, Gel-One
- AHFS/Drugs.com: Multum Consumer Information

Identifiers
- IUPAC name: Hyaluronan Sodium
- PubChem CID: 3084049
- CompTox Dashboard (EPA): DTXSID30238233
- ECHA InfoCard: 100.130.288

Sodium hyaluronate is the sodium salt of hyaluronic acid, a glycosaminoglycan found in various connective tissue of humans.

== Chemistry ==
Sodium hyaluronate is the sodium salt of hyaluronic acid. It is a glycosaminoglycan and long-chain polymer of disaccharide units of Na-glucuronate-N-acetylglucosamine. It can bind to specific receptors for which it has a high affinity.

The polyanionic form, commonly referred to as hyaluronan, is a visco-elastic polymer found in the aqueous and vitreous humour of the eye and in the fluid of articulating joints.

== Natural occurrence ==
Sodium hyaluronate, as hyaluronic acid, is distributed widely in the extracellular matrix of mammalian connective, epithelial, and neural tissues, as well as the corneal endothelium.

== Mechanism of action ==
Sodium hyaluronate functions as a tissue lubricant and is thought to play an important role in modulating the interactions between adjacent tissues. It forms a viscoelastic solution in water. Mechanical protection for tissues (iris, retina) and cell layers (corneal, endothelium, and epithelium) are provided by the high viscosity of the solution. Elasticity of the solution assists in absorbing mechanical stress and providing a protective buffer for tissues. In facilitating wound healing, it is thought that it acts as a protective transport vehicle, taking peptide growth factors and other structural proteins to a site of action. It is then enzymatically degraded and active proteins are released to promote tissue repair.

== Pharmacokinetics ==
Sodium hyaluronate is cleared within hours of injection but appears to have residual effects on contacted cells. In the eye it is eliminated via the canal of Schlemm.

== Adverse effects ==
Adverse effects are relatively rare when used to treat the joints.

When used in ophthalmological procedures, sodium hyaluronate may cause postoperative inflammation, corneal edema or decompensation, and short-term increases in intraocular pressure.

== Medical uses ==
=== Intra-articular injection ===
It is used to treat knee pain in patients with osteoarthritis who have not received relief from other treatments. It is injected into the joint capsule, to act as both a shock absorber and a lubricant for the joint. Thus sodium hyaluronate is used as a viscosupplement, administered through a series of injections into the knee, increasing the viscosity of the synovial fluid, which helps lubricate, cushion and reduce pain in the joint. It is generally used as a last resort before surgery and provides symptomatic relief, by recovering the viscoelasticity of the articular fluid, and by stimulating new production of synovial fluid. Use of sodium hyaluronate may reduce the need for joint replacement. Injections appear to increase in effectiveness over the course of four weeks, reaching a peak at eight weeks and retaining some effectiveness at six months, with greater benefit for osteoarthritis than oral analgesics. It may also be effective when used with the ankle joint.

=== Intraocular viscoelastic injection ===
It is used as an aid in ophthalmic surgery acting as aqueous and vitreous humor, e.g. in cataract extraction (intra- and extracapsular), intraocular lens implantation, corneal transplant, glaucoma filtration, and retina attachment surgery and in the treatment of dry eyes. In surgical procedures in the anterior segment of eyeball, instillation of sodium hyaluronate its viscoelasticity enables maintenance of a deep chamber during surgical manipulation since the solution does not flow out of the open anterior chamber, allowing for efficient manipulation with less trauma to the corneal endothelium and other surrounding tissues. Its viscoelasticity also helps to push back the vitreous face and prevent formation of a postoperative flat chamber. In posterior segment surgery, sodium hyaluronate serves as a surgical aid to gently separate, maneuver, and hold tissues. It creates a clear field of vision, facilitating intra-operative and post-operative inspection of the retina and photocoagulation.

=== Skin injections in plastic surgery ===
Sodium hyaluronate is injected to reduce wrinkles on the face. As of 2017, the FDA had approved 13 hyaluronate preparations as so called dermal fillers. They are also used as a filler of lips or in other parts of the body, though not FDA approved. The filling effect is temporary and lasts for about six months or longer in most people.

=== Topical application ===
Topically applied sodium hyaluronate can facilitate the absorption of biomacromolecules, i.e. pharmaceuticals, and function like a nanocarrier. Its effects on skin depend on the hyaluronate formulation and skin health: In barrier-deficient skin it restricted the delivery of biomacromolecules to the stratum corneum and viable epidermis. In normal skin, low-molecular weight hyaluronate (5 kDa) enhanced penetration into the epidermis.

Transepidermal water loss increased by 55.5% with low-molecular weight, and was reduced by 28% with crosslinked resilient, and by 16% with HMW. Its efficacy against wrinkles has not been tested in clinical trials.

Dry, scaly skin, such as that caused by atopic dermatitis, may be treated with lotion or another skin product containing sodium hyaluronate as its active ingredient.

After instillation into the lung, higher molecular weight hyaluronate appears to persist longer in the lung but if > 215 kD there was poor lung penetration and mucociliary clearance. Hyaluronate could allow access to lymph nodes draining the pulmonary bed.

=== Intravesical instillation ===
Sodium hyaluronate can be instilled into the bladder for the treatment of various forms of cystitis and associated bladder pain, by replenishing the glycosaminoglycan layer of the bladder urothelium.

== Contraindications ==
Sodium hyaluronate has a very low incidence of side effects, however it is contraindicated in people who are sensitive to hyaluronate preparations. If being administered as an intra-articular injection, it should not be given when there are infections or skin disease at the injection site.

== History ==
In the late 1970s and early 1980s the material was used with the brand names of Hylartin and Hylartin Vetused in human and veterinary clinical trials (race horses) to treat osteoarthritis. The first commercially sold sodium hyaluronate had been developed by Endre Alexander Balazs under the brand name of Healon, manufactured by Pharmacia AB in Sweden in 1980. In 1986, sodium hyaluronate was used as an intra-articular injection to treat osteoarthritis of the knee with the product Hyalart/Hyalgan by Fidia of Italy.
