= Urticaria-like follicular mucinosis =

- Specialty: Dermatology

Urticaria-like follicular mucinosis is a rare cutaneous disorder that occurs primarily in middle-aged men.

== See also ==
- Mucinosis
- List of cutaneous conditions
