= Atypical lichen myxedematosus =

- Other names: Intermediate lichen myxedematosus
- Specialty: Dermatology

Atypical lichen myxedematosus is a skin condition caused by fibroblasts producing abnormally large amounts of mucopolysaccharides.

== See also ==
- Lichen myxedematosus
- Skin lesion
