= Perifollicular mucinosis =

- Specialty: Dermatology

Perifollicular mucinosis is a cutaneous condition characterized by mucinosis, and described in HIV-infected patients. It is usually found in adults and rarely seen in children. It can have many causes.

== See also ==
- Eccrine mucinosis
- List of cutaneous conditions
