= CHST14 =

Protein-coding gene in humans

Identifiers
- Aliases: CHST14, ATCS, D4ST1, EDSMC1, HNK1ST, carbohydrate sulfotransferase 14
- External IDs: OMIM: 608429; MGI: 1919386; GeneCards: CHST14
Enzyme activity
EC #	BRENDA	ExPASy	KEGG	MetaCyc
2.8.2.35	↗	↗	↗	↗

Gene location (Human)
Chr.	Chromosome 15 (human)
Band	15q15.1	Start	40,470,984 bp
Band	15q15.1	End	40,473,158 bp

Gene location (Mouse)
Chr.	Chromosome 2 (mouse)
Band	2|2 E5	Start	118,756,977 bp
Band	2|2 E5	End	118,759,066 bp
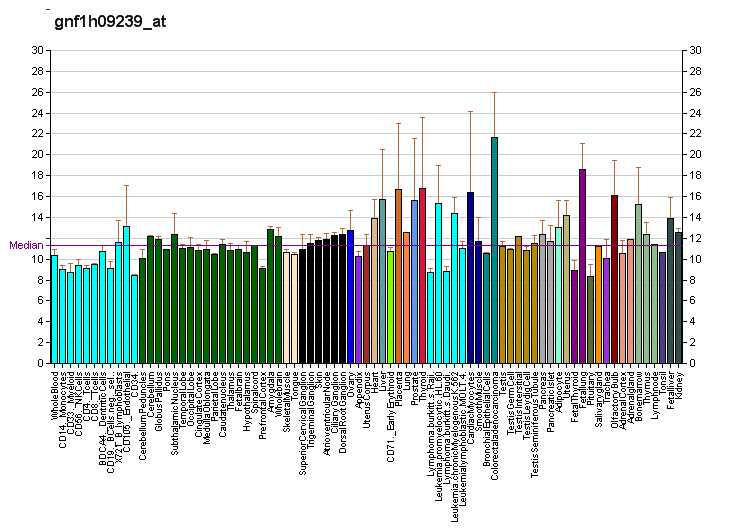
RNA expression pattern
Bgee	Human / Mouse (ortholog); Top expressed in: stromal cell of endometrium; ventricular zone; mucosa of ileum; tibialis anterior muscle; right ovary; ascending aorta; canal of the cervix; placenta; pancreatic ductal cell; body of uterus / Top expressed in: lumbar spinal ganglion; calvaria; stroma of bone marrow; endothelial cell of lymphatic vessel; ascending aorta; interventricular septum; dermis; semi-lunar valve; renal corpuscle; aortic valve; More reference expression data
BioGPS	More reference expression data
Gene ontology
Molecular function	phosphate ion binding; transferase activity; sulfotransferase activity; N-acetylgalactosamine 4-O-sulfotransferase activity
Cellular component	integral component of membrane; Golgi membrane; Golgi apparatus; extracellular exosome; membrane
Biological process	dermatan sulfate biosynthetic process; carbohydrate biosynthetic process; dermatan sulfate proteoglycan metabolic process; carbohydrate metabolic process
Sources:Amigo / QuickGO
Orthologs
Databases	NCBI: entry; OMA: entry
Species	Human	Mouse
Entrez	113189	72136
Ensembl	ENSG00000169105	ENSMUSG00000074916
UniProt	Q8NCH0	Q80V53
RefSeq (mRNA)	NM_130468	NM_028117
RefSeq (protein)	NP_569735	NP_082393
Location (UCSC)	Chr 15: 40.47 – 40.47 Mb	Chr 2: 118.76 – 118.76 Mb
PubMed search
- Wikidata
View/Edit Human	View/Edit Mouse

Carbohydrate sulfotransferase 14 is an enzyme that in humans is encoded by the CHST14 gene.

== Gene ==
CHST14, a protein-coding gene, encodes for the enzyme carbohydrate sulfotransferase 14 (CHST14)/ dermatan 4-O-sulfotransferase (D4ST1).

In humans, CHST14 is positioned on the long arm (q) of chromosome 15 at position 15.1, from base pair 40,470,961 to base pair 40,474,571. The CHST14 gene is 3,611 bases long, composed of 376 amino acids, and has a molecular mass of 42997 Da.

== Ontology ==
CHST14 is implicated in fetal development of connective tissues throughout multiple organ systems. It is also implicated in regulation of proliferation and neurogenesis of neural precursor cells. It has been linked to inhibition of peripheral nerve regeneration in adults.

== Function ==
Dermatan 4-O-sulfotransferase enzymatically transfers an active sulfate to position 4 of N-acetyl-D-galactosamine residues of dermatan sulfate, stabilizing this glycosaminoglycan. Dermatan sulfate is essential to extracellular matrix formation and is found in extensively in skin, tendons, cartilage, and the aortic wall. Mutation of CHST14 results in a deficiency of dermatan sulfate, which disrupts glycosaminoglycan constituents in fibroblasts and impairs collagen fibril linkage within collagen bundles.

== Clinical significance ==
Mutation of CHST14 is associated with the Musculocontractural type of Ehlers–Danlos syndromes, recently specified as CHST14/D4ST1 deficiency. Previously, this condition has been independently referred to as adducted thumb-clubfoot syndrome, Ehlers–Danlos syndrome, Kosho type, musculocontractural Ehlers–Danlos syndrome, and Ehlers–Danlos type VIB. Currently, 40 patients from 27 families have been diagnosed with this autosomal recessive mutation. CHST14/D4ST1 deficiency is the first identified human disease that directly impacts dermatan sulfate production." Hallmark features include congenital malformations (extensive craniofacial defects, skin elasticity, joint laxity, multiple contractures) combined with progressive fragility of affected structures, with increased incidence of bruising, recurrent joint dislocations, pneumothorax, spinal degeneration, and other deformities.
