= Dermatan 4-sulfotransferase =

Enzyme

Identifiers
- EC no.: 2.8.2.35

Databases
- IntEnz: IntEnz view
- BRENDA: BRENDA entry
- ExPASy: NiceZyme view
- KEGG: KEGG entry
- MetaCyc: metabolic pathway
- PRIAM: profile
- PDB structures: RCSB PDB PDBe PDBsum
Search
- PMC: articles
- PubMed: articles
- NCBI: proteins

Dermatan 4-sulfotransferase (EC 2.8.2.35, dermatan-specific N-acetylgalactosamine 4-O-sulfotransferase, dermatan-4-sulfotransferase-1, dermatan-4-sulfotransferase 1, D4ST-1, dermatan N-acetylgalactosamine 4-O-sulfotransferase, CHST14 protein, CHST14) is an enzyme with systematic name 3'-phospho-5'-adenylyl sulfate:(dermatan)-N-acetyl-D-galactosamine 4-sulfotransferase. This enzyme catalyses the following chemical reaction

3'-phospho-5'-adenylyl sulfate + [dermatan]-N-acetyl-D-galactosamine $\rightleftharpoons$ adenosine 3',5'-bisphosphate + [dermatan]-4-O-sulfo-N-acetyl-D-galactosamine

The sulfation takes place at the 4-position of N-acetyl-D-galactosamine residues of dermatan.
