= Bloomage =

Chinese biomaterial company

- Type: Public
- Traded as: SSE: 688363
- Industry: Biomaterial
- Founded: 2000; 26 years ago
- Founder: Zhao Yan
- Headquarters: China
- Area served: Worldwide
- Key people: Zhao Yan (Chairperson & CEO)
- Website: www.bloomagebioactive.com

Bloomage, also known as Bloomage Biotech, is a biomaterial company based in China. Bloomage primarily specializes in hyaluronic acid and other bioactive substance products. It is listed on the Shanghai Stock Exchange. In 2024, Bloomage ranked no.435 in China's 500 Most Valuable Brands list by World Brand Lab.

== History ==
In 2000, Bloomage was established and began to mass-produce hyaluronic acid using microbial fermentation.

Bloomage's first plant in Jinan was completed and put into production in 2005.

Bloomage was licensed by the US FDA and established a US subsidiary in 2012.

== Products ==
Bloomage specializes in hyaluronic acid microbial fermentation production. It also focuses on pharmaceutical, cosmetic, and food-grade application products.

Other than hyaluronic acid, Bloomage also manufactures recombinant collagen, ergothioneine, ectoine, GABA, PDRN, among others. The company also produces skin fillers and various cosmetic products.
