= Atypical tuberous myxedema =

- Specialty: Dermatology

Atypical tuberous myxedema, also known as Jadassohn–Dosseker syndrome, is thought to represent a pure nodular variant of lichen myxedematosus.

== See also ==
- Skin lesion
- List of cutaneous conditions
