= Papular mucinosis of infancy =

- Other names: Cutaneous mucinosis of infancy
- Specialty: Dermatology

Papular mucinosis of infancy is a skin condition caused by fibroblasts producing abnormally large amounts of mucopolysaccharides, characterized by skin-colored or translucent papules.

== See also ==
- Papular mucinosis
- List of cutaneous conditions
