= Nodular lichen myxedematosus =

- Specialty: Dermatology

Nodular lichen myxedematosus is a cutaneous condition characterized by multiple nodules on the limbs and trunk, with a mild or absent papular component.

== Signs and symptoms ==
Nodular lichen myxedematosus is a subtype of localized lichen myxedematosus that does not have thyroid disease or monoclonal gammopathy, and is characterized by papular or nodular and plaque eruptions.

== Diagnosis ==
The lesion exhibits variable fibroblast proliferation along with mucin deposition.

== See also ==
- Papular mucinosis
- List of cutaneous conditions
