= Alguronic acid =

Alguronic acid is the tradename created for an undetermined mix of polysaccharides produced by microalgae clogging filters in algae cultures. The tradename has been coined by Solazyme. The indeterminate mix of chemicals is claimed to function to protect the microalgae, and has been processed and formulated in a range of products. In 2011, the acid was introduced to the market as an active ingredient in a commercial product called Algenist anti-aging skincare formulas.

Alguronic acid is not a technical name referring to a single polysaccharide, but a mix of algae extracts claimed to have anti-aging benefits for the skin.

== Scientific testing ==
When tested by commercial laboratories, alguronic acid showed significant results in several skin benefit and anti-aging parameters, both independently and compared to other well-known anti-aging ingredients. The funding for these third party laboratories is not disclosed. The acid, an heterogeneous mix of polysaccharides, will vary in composition depending on the growth conditions of the mixed algae cultures; the individual structures of the components of this mix has not been established.

Alguronic acid is not naturally present in human skin, should not be affected by skin enzymes, and is unlikely to be used by the skin. Conversely, hyaluronic acid is distributed throughout the body, is naturally produced in the skin, and, based on its ability to retain moisture, plays a major role in tissue structure and repair. In testing done by commercial laboratories, alguronic acid was found to inhibit production of hyaluronic-acid-degrading enzymes by up to 67%. The relevance of this inhibition in vitro to skin physiology is unknown.
