= CHST1 =

Protein-coding gene in humans

Identifiers
- Aliases: CHST1, C6ST, GST-1, KS6ST, KSGal6ST, KSST, carbohydrate sulfotransferase 1
- External IDs: OMIM: 603797; MGI: 1924219; GeneCards: CHST1
Enzyme activity
EC #	BRENDA	ExPASy	KEGG	MetaCyc
2.8.2.21	↗	↗	↗	↗

Gene location (Human)
Chr.	Chromosome 11 (human)
Band	11p11.2	Start	45,647,689 bp
Band	11p11.2	End	45,665,622 bp

Gene location (Mouse)
Chr.	Chromosome 2 (mouse)
Band	2|2 E1	Start	92,430,052 bp
Band	2|2 E1	End	92,445,595 bp
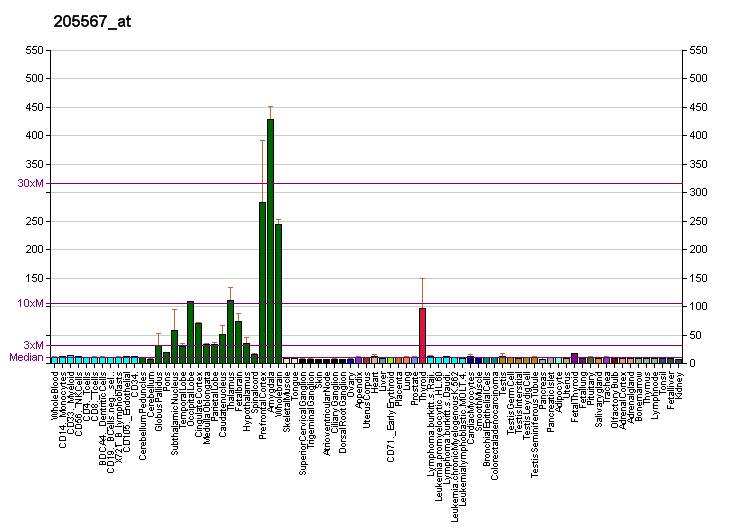
RNA expression pattern
Bgee	Human / Mouse (ortholog); Top expressed in: frontal pole; Brodmann area 10; middle frontal gyrus; parietal lobe; amygdala; anterior cingulate cortex; right frontal lobe; postcentral gyrus; orbitofrontal cortex; dorsolateral prefrontal cortex / Top expressed in: lacrimal gland; molar; habenula; olfactory tubercle; subiculum; temporal lobe; prefrontal cortex; nucleus accumbens; primary motor cortex; anterior amygdaloid area; More reference expression data
BioGPS	More reference expression data
Gene ontology
Molecular function	transferase activity; sulfotransferase activity; N-acetylglucosamine 6-O-sulfotransferase activity; keratan sulfotransferase activity
Cellular component	Golgi membrane; Golgi apparatus; membrane; integral component of membrane; trans-Golgi network
Biological process	sulfur compound metabolic process; galactose metabolic process; inflammatory response; keratan sulfate biosynthetic process; polysaccharide metabolic process; keratan sulfate metabolic process; carbohydrate metabolic process; N-acetylglucosamine metabolic process
Sources:Amigo / QuickGO
Orthologs
Databases	NCBI: entry; OMA: entry
Species	Human	Mouse
Entrez	8534	76969
Ensembl	ENSG00000175264	ENSMUSG00000027221
UniProt	O43916	Q9EQC0
RefSeq (mRNA)	NM_003654	NM_023850; NM_001356552; NM_001356553
RefSeq (protein)	NP_003645	NP_076339; NP_001343481; NP_001343482
Location (UCSC)	Chr 11: 45.65 – 45.67 Mb	Chr 2: 92.43 – 92.45 Mb
PubMed search
- Wikidata
View/Edit Human	View/Edit Mouse

Carbohydrate sulfotransferase 1 is an enzyme that in humans is encoded by the CHST1 gene.
