= Discrete papular lichen myxedematosus =

- Specialty: Dermatology

Discrete papular lichen myxedematosus is a skin condition caused by fibroblasts producing abnormally large amounts of mucopolysaccharides characterized by the occurrence of waxy, flesh-colored papules..

== Signs and symptoms ==
Discrete papular lichen myxedematosus is typically identified by the presence of violaceous, flesh-colored, or reddish, waxy papules that range in size from 2 to 5 mm and that symmetrically affect the trunk and limbs.

== Causes ==
This disease's etiology is still unknown.

== Diagnosis ==
Histologically, a normal epidermis is covered by a diffuse or focal mucinous deposit and edema in the upper and mid dermis. Although there isn't any sclerosis or collagen deposition, fibroblast proliferation varies.

== Treatment ==
Numerous therapies have been attempted, with varying degrees of success, such as dermabrasion, carbon-dioxide laser, intralesional injections of corticosteroids or hyaluronidase, oral retinoids, psoralen ultraviolet A, and pimecrolimus. Given its ability to inhibit both tumor necrosis factor-a and transforming growth factor-b, thus decreasing the synthesis of glycosaminoglycans by fibroblasts, topical tacrolimus 0.1% has recently been proposed as an effective substitute.

== See also ==
- Papular mucinosis
- List of cutaneous conditions
