= HAS3 =

Protein-coding gene in the species Homo sapiens

Identifiers
- Aliases: HAS3, hyaluronan synthase 3
- External IDs: OMIM: 602428; MGI: 109599; GeneCards: HAS3
Enzyme activity
EC #	BRENDA	ExPASy	KEGG	MetaCyc
2.4.1.212	↗	↗	↗	↗

Gene location (Human)
Chr.	Chromosome 16 (human)
Band	16q22.1	Start	69,105,653 bp
Band	16q22.1	End	69,118,719 bp

Gene location (Mouse)
Chr.	Chromosome 8 (mouse)
Band	8 D3|8 53.28 cM	Start	107,596,874 bp
Band	8 D3|8 53.28 cM	End	107,611,198 bp
RNA expression pattern
Bgee	Human / Mouse (ortholog); Top expressed in: secondary oocyte; cartilage tissue; mucosa of esophagus; urinary bladder; tendon of biceps brachii; mucosa of transverse colon; vagina; testicle; olfactory zone of nasal mucosa; skin of abdomen / Top expressed in: inner enamel epithelium; stratum intermedium; hair follicle; secondary oocyte; hair; primary oocyte; mandibular molars; zygote; tail of embryo; lip; More reference expression data
BioGPS	n/a
Gene ontology
Molecular function	transferase activity; glycosyltransferase activity; hyaluronan synthase activity; protein binding; identical protein binding
Cellular component	cytoplasm; integral component of membrane; plasma membrane; hyaluranon cable; integral component of plasma membrane; membrane
Biological process	positive regulation of transcription, DNA-templated; cell adhesion; hyaluronan biosynthetic process; extracellular matrix assembly; positive regulation of hyaluranon cable assembly; extracellular polysaccharide biosynthetic process; carbohydrate metabolic process
Sources:Amigo / QuickGO
Orthologs
Databases	NCBI: entry; OMA: entry
Species	Human	Mouse
Entrez	3038	15118
Ensembl	ENSG00000103044	ENSMUSG00000031910
UniProt	O00219	O08650
RefSeq (mRNA)	NM_001199280; NM_005329; NM_138612	NM_008217; NM_001331048
RefSeq (protein)	NP_001186209; NP_005320; NP_619515	NP_001317977; NP_032243
Location (UCSC)	Chr 16: 69.11 – 69.12 Mb	Chr 8: 107.6 – 107.61 Mb
PubMed search
- Wikidata
View/Edit Human	View/Edit Mouse

Hyaluronan synthase 3 is an enzyme that in humans is encoded by the HAS3 gene.

The protein encoded by this gene is involved in the synthesis of the unbranched glycosaminoglycan hyaluronan, or hyaluronic acid, which is a major constituent of the extracellular matrix. This gene is a member of the NODC/HAS gene family. Compared to the proteins encoded by other members of this gene family, this protein appears to be more of a regulator of hyaluronan synthesis. Two transcript variants encoding different isoforms have been found for this gene.
