= HAS2 =

Protein-coding gene in the species Homo sapiens

Identifiers
- Aliases: HAS2, hyaluronan synthase 2
- External IDs: OMIM: 601636; MGI: 107821; GeneCards: HAS2
Enzyme activity
EC #	BRENDA	ExPASy	KEGG	MetaCyc
2.4.1.212	↗	↗	↗	↗

Gene location (Human)
Chr.	Chromosome 8 (human)
Band	8q24.13	Start	121,612,116 bp
Band	8q24.13	End	121,641,440 bp

Gene location (Mouse)
Chr.	Chromosome 15 (mouse)
Band	15 D1|15 23.31 cM	Start	56,529,023 bp
Band	15 D1|15 23.31 cM	End	56,557,935 bp
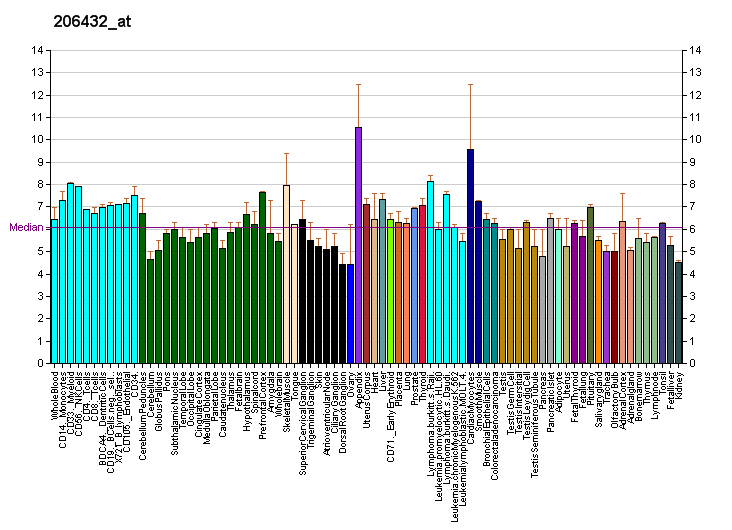
RNA expression pattern
Bgee	Human / Mouse (ortholog); Top expressed in: cartilage tissue; stromal cell of endometrium; tibia; synovial joint; sperm; Achilles tendon; gallbladder; rectum; islet of Langerhans; epithelium of colon / Top expressed in: vas deferens; tail of embryo; abdominal wall; maxillary prominence; hand; efferent ductule; conjunctival fornix; atrioventricular canal; epiblast; primitive streak; More reference expression data
BioGPS	More reference expression data
Gene ontology
Molecular function	transferase activity; glycosyltransferase activity; hyaluronan synthase activity; protein binding; identical protein binding
Cellular component	cytoplasm; integral component of membrane; membrane; integral component of plasma membrane; plasma membrane raft
Biological process	atrioventricular canal development; positive regulation of keratinocyte proliferation; hyaluronan biosynthetic process; positive regulation of urine volume; kidney development; estrous cycle; positive regulation of cell migration; cellular response to tumor necrosis factor; bone morphogenesis; cellular response to platelet-derived growth factor stimulus; cellular response to fluid shear stress; vasculogenesis; positive regulation of smooth muscle cell migration; positive regulation of keratinocyte migration; positive regulation of substrate adhesion-dependent cell spreading; positive regulation of hyaluronan biosynthetic process; extracellular matrix assembly; cellular response to interleukin-1; positive regulation of cell population proliferation; extracellular polysaccharide biosynthetic process; hyaluronan metabolic process; endocardial cushion to mesenchymal transition; renal water absorption; positive regulation of monocyte aggregation; regulation of extracellular matrix assembly
Sources:Amigo / QuickGO
Orthologs
Databases	NCBI: entry; OMA: entry
Species	Human	Mouse
Entrez	3037	15117
Ensembl	ENSG00000170961	ENSMUSG00000022367
UniProt	Q92819	P70312
RefSeq (mRNA)	NM_005328	NM_008216
RefSeq (protein)	NP_005319	NP_032242
Location (UCSC)	Chr 8: 121.61 – 121.64 Mb	Chr 15: 56.53 – 56.56 Mb
PubMed search
- Wikidata
View/Edit Human	View/Edit Mouse

Hyaluronan synthase 2 is an enzyme that in humans is encoded by the HAS2 gene.

Hyaluronan or hyaluronic acid is a high molecular weight unbranched polysaccharide synthesized by a wide variety of organisms from bacteria to mammals, and is a constituent of the extracellular matrix. It consists of alternating glucuronic acid and N-acetylglucosamine residues that are linked by beta-1-3 and beta-1-4 glycosidic bonds. Hyaluronic acid is synthesized by membrane-bound synthase at the inner surface of the plasma membrane, and the chains are extruded via ABC-Transporter into the extracellular space. It serves a variety of functions, including space filling, lubrication of joints, and provision of a matrix through which cells can migrate. Hyaluronic acid is produced during wound healing and tissue repair to provide a framework for the ingrowth of blood vessels and fibroblasts. Changes in the serum concentration of hyaluronic acid are associated with inflammatory and degenerative arthropathies such as rheumatoid arthritis. In addition, the interaction of hyaluronic acid with the leukocyte receptor CD44 is important in tissue-specific homing by leukocytes, and overexpression of hyaluronic acid receptors has been correlated with tumor metastasis. HAS2 is a member of the vertebrate gene family encoding putative hyaluronan synthases, and its amino acid sequence shows significant homology to glycosaminoglycan synthetase (DG42) from Xenopus laevis, and human and murine hyaluronan synthase 1.
