= CHST2 =

Protein-coding gene in humans

Identifiers
- Aliases: CHST2, C6ST, GST-2, GST2, Gn6ST-1, HEL-S-75, glcNAc6ST-1, carbohydrate sulfotransferase 2
- External IDs: OMIM: 603798; MGI: 1891160; GeneCards: CHST2

Gene location (Human)
Chr.	Chromosome 3 (human)
Band	3q24	Start	143,119,771 bp
Band	3q24	End	143,124,014 bp

Gene location (Mouse)
Chr.	Chromosome 9 (mouse)
Band	9|9 E3.3	Start	95,281,345 bp
Band	9|9 E3.3	End	95,288,775 bp
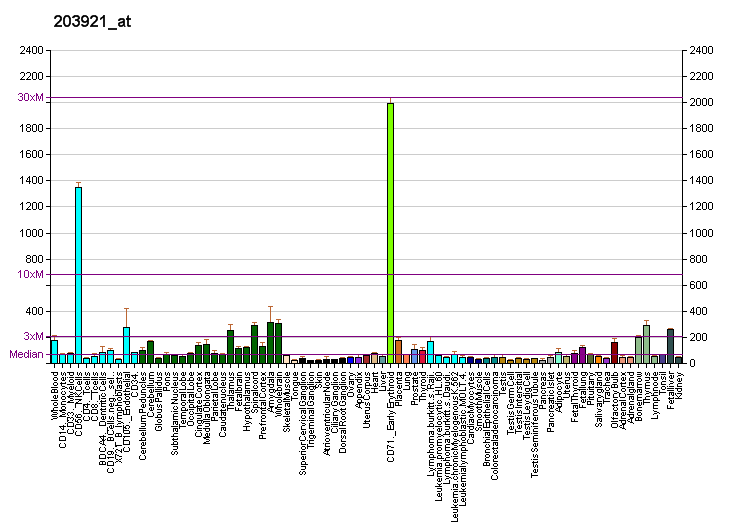
RNA expression pattern
Bgee	Human / Mouse (ortholog); Top expressed in: decidua; lateral nuclear group of thalamus; hair follicle; trabecular bone; cartilage tissue; spinal cord; C1 segment; olfactory bulb; granulocyte; subthalamic nucleus / Top expressed in: supraoptic nucleus; olfactory tubercle; habenula; ascending aorta; medial geniculate nucleus; aortic valve; subiculum; lateral septal nucleus; lateral geniculate nucleus; medial dorsal nucleus; More reference expression data
BioGPS	More reference expression data
Gene ontology
Molecular function	transferase activity; sulfotransferase activity; N-acetylglucosamine 6-O-sulfotransferase activity
Cellular component	integral component of membrane; Golgi membrane; trans-Golgi network; intrinsic component of Golgi membrane; membrane; Golgi apparatus
Biological process	multicellular organism development; sulfur compound metabolic process; inflammatory response; keratan sulfate biosynthetic process; N-acetylglucosamine metabolic process; carbohydrate metabolic process
Sources:Amigo / QuickGO
Orthologs
Databases	NCBI: entry; OMA: entry
Species	Human	Mouse
Entrez	9435	54371
Ensembl	ENSG00000175040	ENSMUSG00000033350
UniProt	Q9Y4C5	Q80WV3
RefSeq (mRNA)	NM_004267	NM_018763
RefSeq (protein)	NP_004258	NP_061233
Location (UCSC)	Chr 3: 143.12 – 143.12 Mb	Chr 9: 95.28 – 95.29 Mb
PubMed search
- Wikidata
View/Edit Human	View/Edit Mouse

Carbohydrate sulfotransferase 2 is an enzyme that in humans is encoded by the CHST2 gene.
