= Self-healing juvenile cutaneous mucinosis =

- Specialty: Dermatology

Self-healing juvenile cutaneous mucinosis is a skin condition caused by fibroblasts producing abnormally large amounts of mucopolysaccharides, and is characterized by the sudden onset of skin lesions and polyarthritis.

== Signs and symptoms ==
Combinations of nodules affecting the head, neck, and periarticular (particularly interphalangeal) joints, as well as linearly arranged ivory white papules over erythematous indurated skin, are examples of cutaneous manifestations.

Myalgia, pyrexia, and muscle exhaustion are examples of mild inflammatory symptoms that typically appear at the same time as cutaneous lesions. More significantly, although they are uncommon, inflammatory symptoms can be connected to cutaneous lesions. These consist of transient hypertension, arthritic and joint pain, and severe hand and joint edema. Lesions lack extracutaneous involvement and are linked to absent to mild inflammatory symptoms like arthralgia, fever, weakness, and muscle tenderness. Additional symptoms include swelling in the hands, elbows, and knees, as well as excruciating polyarthritis or momentary hypertension.

== Causes ==
It is still unclear what initially causes the overproduction of mucin and the rise in fibroblast production. Some authors speculated that it might be because of an infection or inflammation that stimulates the antigenic response continuously at the level of initial fibroblast and mucin production.

== Diagnosis ==
MRI findings of myositis and subcutaneous tissue edema have been identified along with other abnormalities such as elevated aldolase levels, lymphocytosis, accelerated erythrocyte sedimentation rate, and antibodies against Bartonella.

== See also ==
- Lichen myxedematosus
- Skin lesion
