= Hyaluronan-mediated motility receptor =

Protein-coding gene in the species Homo sapiens

HMMR

Identifiers
- Aliases: HMMR, CD168, IHABP, RHAMM, Hyaluronan-mediated motility receptor, hyaluronan mediated motility receptor
- External IDs: OMIM: 600936; MGI: 104667; GeneCards: HMMR

Gene location (Human)
Chr.	Chromosome 5 (human)
Band	5q34	Start	163,460,203 bp
Band	5q34	End	163,491,941 bp

Gene location (Mouse)
Chr.	Chromosome 11 (mouse)
Band	11 A5|11 24.4 cM	Start	40,592,222 bp
Band	11 A5|11 24.4 cM	End	40,624,249 bp
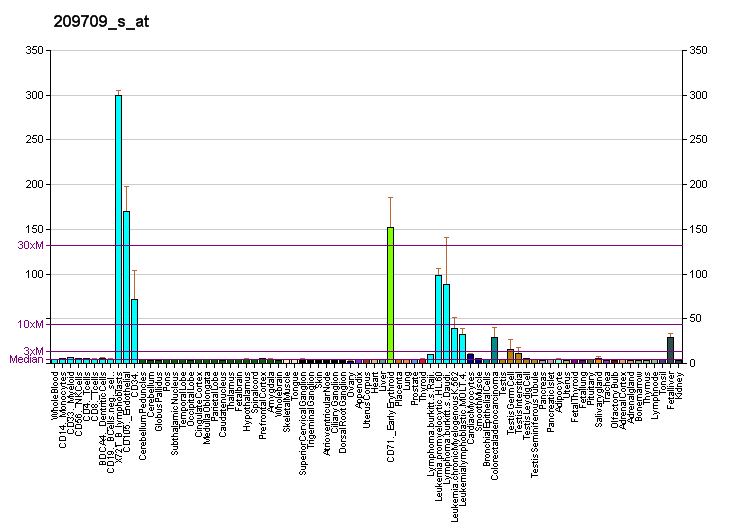

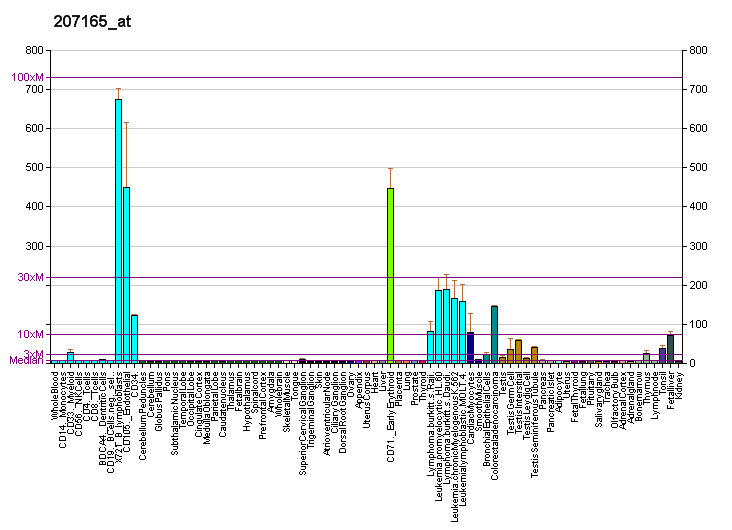
RNA expression pattern
Bgee	Human / Mouse (ortholog); Top expressed in: sperm; trabecular bone; testicle; gonad; secondary oocyte; bone marrow; ventricular zone; embryo; bone marrow cell; appendix / Top expressed in: Paneth cell; condyle; genital tubercle; tail of embryo; lumbar spinal ganglion; fossa; atrium; maxillary prominence; endothelial cell of lymphatic vessel; atrioventricular junction; More reference expression data
BioGPS	More reference expression data
Gene ontology
Molecular function	protein binding; hyaluronic acid binding
Cellular component	cytoplasm; cell surface; plasma membrane; membrane; cytosol; centrosome; microtubule cytoskeleton
Biological process	hyaluronan catabolic process; regulation of G2/M transition of mitotic cell cycle
Sources:Amigo / QuickGO
Orthologs
Databases	NCBI: entry; OMA: entry
Species	Human	Mouse
Entrez	3161	15366
Ensembl	ENSG00000072571	ENSMUSG00000020330
UniProt	O75330	Q00547
RefSeq (mRNA)	NM_012485; NM_001142556; NM_001142557; NM_012484	NM_013552
RefSeq (protein)	NP_001136028; NP_001136029; NP_036616; NP_036617	NP_038580
Location (UCSC)	Chr 5: 163.46 – 163.49 Mb	Chr 11: 40.59 – 40.62 Mb
PubMed search
- Wikidata
View/Edit Human	View/Edit Mouse

Hyaluronan-mediated motility receptor (HMMR), also known as RHAMM (Receptor for Hyaluronan Mediated Motility) is a protein which in humans is encoded by the HMMR gene. RHAMM recently has been also designated CD168 (cluster of differentiation 168).

== Function ==
RHAMM was originally discovered as a soluble protein that altered migratory cell behavior and bound to hyaluronan. RHAMM is less well studied than the main hyaluronan (HA) receptor, CD44. In contrast to CD44 and other cell-surface receptors which contain the classical membrane spanning domain and signal sequence for secretion from the endoplasmic reticulum / Golgi complex, RHAMM does not contain a membrane spanning domain nor does the mRNA transcript contain a signal sequence. RHAMM is localized inside the cell and is unconventionally exported to the cell surface in response to certain defined stimuli such as wounding and cytokines including TGF-β. The precise unconventional export mechanism for transporting RHAMM to the extracellular space is still unclear but may involve transport channels or proteins, flippase activity, or exocytosis, similar to other non-conventionally exported cell surface proteins such as BFGF1,2 and epimorphin.

Intracellularly, RHAMM associates with microtubules and, working with BRCA1 and BARD1, plays a role in the regulation of mitosis, and in maintaining mitotic spindle integrity. RHAMM also binds directly with ERK1 and forms complexes with ERK1,2 and MEK1, suggesting a role as a scaffold protein that targets these MAP kinases to the nucleus.

Extracellularly, RHAMM associates with CD44, and upon binding to hyaluronan, activates intracellular signaling pathways, mainly the MAPK pathway via ERK1,2 activation Variants of RHAMM caused by alternative splicing have been observed, and alternative start codon usage has been proposed in mice and directly observed in humans.

== Clinical significance ==
RHAMM is over expressed in breast cancer and its expression in triple negative and HER2 subtypes is associated with poor outcome. Alternatively spliced forms of RHAMM may be up regulated in some tumor types, promoting tumor progression. The presence of breast tumor cell subsets with high RHAMM expression is associated with reduced metastasis free survival and mediates migration, transformation, and metastatic spread of the triple negative human BCa cell line MDA-MB-231.

Elevated levels of RHAMM and hyaluronan are associated with the likelihood of undergoing biochemical failure in intermediate risk prostate cancer patients. RHAMM is also one of 3 biomarkers associated with aggressiveness in a multivariate analysis of human prostate tumors and elevated levels of RHAMM are associated with both androgen deprivation therapy and castration resistant disease. RHAMM has also been identified as one of 4 gene products identified in circulating tumor cells in patients with lung adenocarcinoma.

While RHAMM has been less studied than CD44 in the process of cancer metastasis, it is likely just as important in this process and can act in concert with, or independently of CD44 to promote cell motility. Increased RHAMM expression is correlated with metastases in colorectal cancer, among others. Mechanistically, RHAMM has been shown to promote cell motility through a number of different pathways. As with CD44, RHAMM can promote focal adhesion turnover by controlling focal adhesion kinase (FAK) phosphorylation and cooperating with the α4β1 and α5β1 integrins. RHAMM also activates a number of downstream kinases including enhancing the intensity and sustaining the duration of ERK1 / ERK2 activation through the map kinase (MAPK) pathway, pp60 (c-src), and the downstream targets of rho kinase (ROK). Finally, once a metastatic lesion has been established, RHAMM can cooperate with CD44 to promote angiogenesis by promoting migration of neighboring endothelial cells towards the tumor.
