= HAS1 =

Protein-coding gene in the species Homo sapiens

Identifiers
- Aliases: HAS1, HAS, hyaluronan synthase 1
- External IDs: OMIM: 601463; MGI: 106590; GeneCards: HAS1
Enzyme activity
EC #	BRENDA	ExPASy	KEGG	MetaCyc
2.4.1.212	↗	↗	↗	↗

Gene location (Human)
Chr.	Chromosome 19 (human)
Band	19q13.41	Start	51,713,112 bp
Band	19q13.41	End	51,723,991 bp

Gene location (Mouse)
Chr.	Chromosome 17 (mouse)
Band	17 A3.2|17 10.53 cM	Start	18,063,585 bp
Band	17 A3.2|17 10.53 cM	End	18,075,467 bp
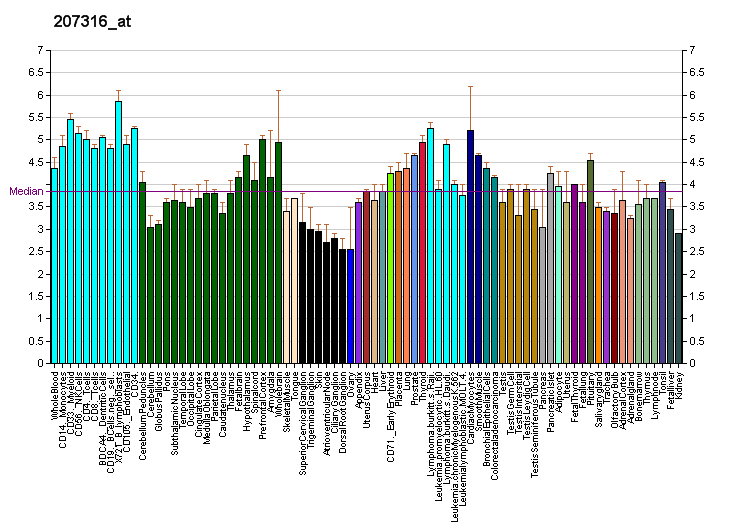
RNA expression pattern
Bgee	Human / Mouse (ortholog); Top expressed in: testicle; parietal pleura; vena cava; germinal epithelium; right ovary; synovial joint; left ovary; synovial membrane; pericardium; middle temporal gyrus / Top expressed in: ankle joint; ankle; genital tubercle; tail of embryo; embryo; facial motor nucleus; trachea; aortic valve; submandibular gland; ascending aorta; More reference expression data
BioGPS	More reference expression data
Gene ontology
Molecular function	glycosyltransferase activity; transferase activity; hyaluronan synthase activity; protein binding; identical protein binding
Cellular component	cytoplasm; integral component of membrane; plasma membrane; integral component of plasma membrane; membrane
Biological process	cell adhesion; negative regulation of fibroblast migration; hyaluronan biosynthetic process; cellular response to platelet-derived growth factor stimulus; extracellular matrix assembly; glycosaminoglycan biosynthetic process; extracellular polysaccharide biosynthetic process; estrous cycle
Sources:Amigo / QuickGO
Orthologs
Databases	NCBI: entry; OMA: entry
Species	Human	Mouse
Entrez	3036	15116
Ensembl	ENSG00000105509	ENSMUSG00000003665
UniProt	Q92839	Q61647
RefSeq (mRNA)	NM_001297436; NM_001523	NM_008215
RefSeq (protein)	NP_001284365; NP_001514	NP_032241
Location (UCSC)	Chr 19: 51.71 – 51.72 Mb	Chr 17: 18.06 – 18.08 Mb
PubMed search
- Wikidata
View/Edit Human	View/Edit Mouse

Hyaluronan synthase 1 is an enzyme that in humans is encoded by the HAS1 gene.

== Structure ==
Hyaluronan or hyaluronic acid (HA) is a high molecular weight unbranched polysaccharide synthesized by a wide variety of organisms from bacteria to mammals, and is a constituent of the extracellular matrix. It consists of alternating glucuronic acid and N-acetylglucosamine residues that are linked by beta-1-3 and beta-1-4 glycosidic bonds. HA is synthesized by membrane-bound synthase at the inner surface of the plasma membrane, and the chains are extruded via ABC-transporter into the extracellular space.

== Function ==
It serves a variety of functions, including space filling, lubrication of joints, and provision of a matrix through which cells can migrate. HA is actively produced during wound healing and tissue repair to provide a framework for ingrowth of blood vessels and fibroblasts. Changes in the serum concentration of HA are associated with inflammatory and degenerative arthropathies such as rheumatoid arthritis. In addition, the interaction of HA with the leukocyte receptor CD44 is important in tissue-specific homing by leukocytes, and overexpression of HA receptors has been correlated with tumor metastasis. HAS1 is a member of the newly identified vertebrate gene family encoding putative hyaluronan synthases, and its amino acid sequence shows significant homology to the hasA gene product of Streptococcus pyogenes, a glycosaminoglycan synthetase (DG42) from Xenopus laevis, and a recently described murine hyaluronan synthase.
