= NDST1 =

Enzyme

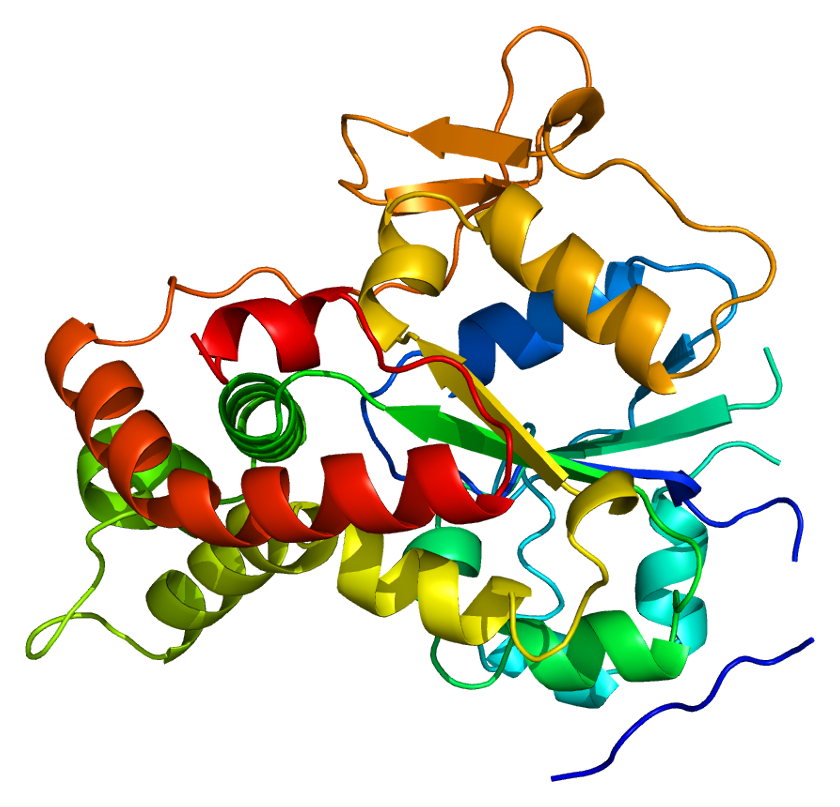

Identifiers
- Aliases: NDST1, HSST, NST1, MRT46, N-deacetylase/N-sulfotransferase 1, N-deacetylase and N-sulfotransferase 1
- External IDs: OMIM: 600853; MGI: 104719; GeneCards: NDST1
Available structures
PDB	Ortholog search: PDBe RCSB
PDB	List of PDB id codes 1NST
Enzyme activity
EC #	BRENDA	ExPASy	KEGG	MetaCyc
2.8.2.8	↗	↗	↗	↗

Gene location (Human)
Chr.	Chromosome 5 (human)
Band	5q33.1	Start	150,485,818 bp
Band	5q33.1	End	150,558,211 bp

Gene location (Mouse)
Chr.	Chromosome 18 (mouse)
Band	18|18 E1	Start	60,817,566 bp
Band	18|18 E1	End	60,881,722 bp
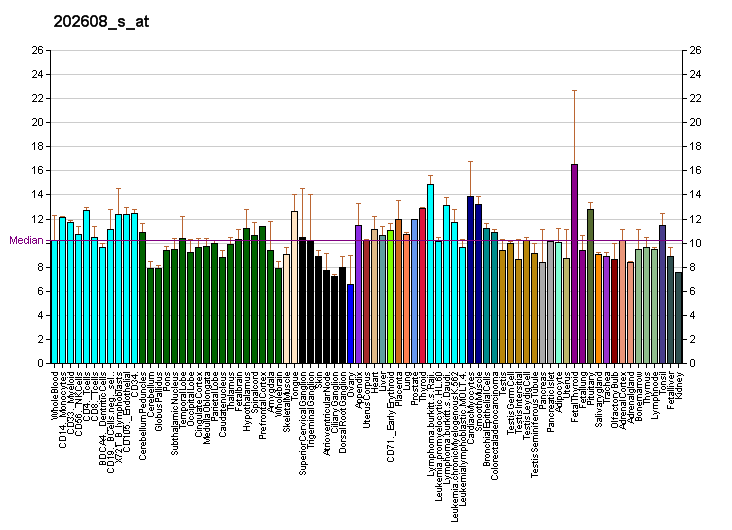
RNA expression pattern
Bgee	Human / Mouse (ortholog); Top expressed in: stromal cell of endometrium; C1 segment; olfactory bulb; subthalamic nucleus; inferior ganglion of vagus nerve; right lobe of liver; lateral nuclear group of thalamus; mucosa of esophagus; inferior olivary nucleus; upper lobe of left lung / Top expressed in: right lung lobe; left lung; left lung lobe; lacrimal gland; epithelium of stomach; left lobe of liver; human fetus; salivary gland; vas deferens; digastric muscle; More reference expression data
BioGPS	More reference expression data
Gene ontology
Molecular function	transferase activity; sulfotransferase activity; deacetylase activity; catalytic activity; hydrolase activity; N-acetylglucosamine deacetylase activity; protein binding; [heparan sulfate-glucosamine N-sulfotransferase activity]; heparan sulfate N-acetylglucosaminyltransferase activity; heparan sulfate sulfotransferase activity
Cellular component	integral component of membrane; Golgi apparatus; membrane; Golgi membrane
Biological process	cardiac septum development; heparin biosynthetic process; embryonic neurocranium morphogenesis; coronary vasculature development; respiratory gaseous exchange by respiratory system; fibroblast growth factor receptor signaling pathway; aorta development; development of the heart; glycosaminoglycan biosynthetic process; animal organ morphogenesis; embryonic viscerocranium morphogenesis; polysaccharide biosynthetic process; forebrain development; metabolism; protein sulfation; inflammatory response; midbrain development; glycosaminoglycan metabolic process; heparan sulfate proteoglycan biosynthetic process; heparan sulfate proteoglycan biosynthetic process, polysaccharide chain biosynthetic process; positive regulation of MAPK cascade; positive regulation of smoothened signaling pathway; sulfur compound metabolic process
Sources:Amigo / QuickGO
Orthologs
Databases	NCBI: entry; OMA: entry
Species	Human	Mouse
Entrez	3340	15531
Ensembl	ENSG00000070614	ENSMUSG00000054008
UniProt	P52848	Q3UHN9
RefSeq (mRNA)	NM_001301063; NM_001543	NM_008306; NM_001348100; NM_001348101; NM_001348102; NM_001348103 NM_001348146
RefSeq (protein)	NP_001287992; NP_001534	NP_032332; NP_001335029; NP_001335030; NP_001335031; NP_001335032 NP_001335075
Location (UCSC)	Chr 5: 150.49 – 150.56 Mb	Chr 18: 60.82 – 60.88 Mb
PubMed search
- Wikidata
View/Edit Human	View/Edit Mouse

Bifunctional heparan sulfate N-deacetylase/N-sulfotransferase 1 is an enzyme. In humans, it is encoded by the NDST1 gene.
