= Localized lichen myxedematosus =

- Other names: Papular mucinosis
- Specialty: Dermatology

Localized lichen myxedematosus is a group of skin condition caused by fibroblasts producing abnormally large amounts of mucopolysaccharides, a disease for which there is no treatment.

== See also ==
- Papular mucinosis
- List of cutaneous conditions
