= Hyaluronic acid =

Physiological molecule and therapeutic drug

- Haworth projection

Names
- IUPAC name (1→4)-(2-Acetamido-2-deoxy-D-gluco)-(1→3)-D-glucuronoglycan
- Systematic IUPAC name Poly{[(2S,3R,4R,5S,6R)-3-acetamido-5-hydroxy-6-(hydroxymethyl)oxane-2,4-diyl]oxy[(2R,3R,4R,5S,6S)-6-carboxy-3,4-dihydroxyoxane-2,5-diyl]oxy}

Identifiers
CAS Number	9004-61-9
ChEBI	CHEBI:16336
ChemSpider	None
ECHA InfoCard	100.029.695
EC Number	232-678-0
PubChem CID	7526
UNII	S270N0TRQY
CompTox Dashboard (EPA)	DTXSID90925319 DTXSID7046750, DTXSID90925319

Properties
Chemical formula	(C_{14}H_{21}NO_{11})_{n}

Pharmacology
ATC code	D03AX05 (WHO) M09AX01 (WHO), R01AX09 (WHO), S01KA01 (WHO)

Related compounds
Related compounds	D-Glucuronic acid and N-acetyl-D-glucosamine (monomers); Sodium hyaluronate
- Except where otherwise noted, data are given for materials in their standard state (at 25 °C [77 °F], 100 kPa). verify (what is ?) Infobox references

Hyaluronic acid (/ˌhaɪ.əljʊəˈrɒnɪk/; HA; conjugate base hyaluronate), also called hyaluronan, is an anionic, nonsulfated glycosaminoglycan distributed widely throughout connective, epithelial, and neural tissues. It is unique among glycosaminoglycans as it is non-sulfated, forms in the plasma membrane instead of the Golgi apparatus, and can be very large: human synovial HA averages about 7 MDa per molecule, or about 20,000 disaccharide monomers, while other sources mention 3–4 MDa.

Medically, hyaluronic acid is used to treat osteoarthritis of the knee and dry eye, for wound repair, and as a cosmetic filler.

These therapeutic uses are possible with modifications to HA, and more are still being developed.

The average 70 kg (150 lb) person has roughly 15 grams of hyaluronan in the body, one third of which is turned over (i.e., degraded and synthesized) per day.

As one of the chief components of the extracellular matrix, it contributes significantly to cell proliferation and migration, and is involved in the progression of many malignant tumors. Hyaluronic acid is also a component of the group A streptococcal extracellular capsule, and is believed to play a role in virulence.

Chemical modifications to HA can improve certain properties such as biocompatibility, permeation, and sustained drug release. Common modification sites include the carboxyl, primary alcohol, and N-acetyl groups. These modifications include amidation, Ugi condensation, esterification, and etherification.

== Physiological function ==
Until the late 1970s, hyaluronic acid was described as a "goo" molecule, a ubiquitous carbohydrate polymer that is part of the extracellular matrix. For example, hyaluronic acid is a major component of the synovial fluid and was found to increase the viscosity of the fluid. Along with lubricin, it is one of the fluid's main lubricating components.

Hyaluronic acid is an important component of articular cartilage, where it is present as a coat around each cell (chondrocyte). When aggrecan monomers bind to hyaluronan in the presence of HAPLN1 (hyaluronic acid and proteoglycan link protein 1), large, highly negatively charged aggregates form. These aggregates imbibe water and are responsible for the resilience of cartilage (its resistance to compression). The molecular weight (size) of hyaluronan in cartilage decreases with age, but the amount increases.

A lubricating role of hyaluronan in muscular connective tissues to enhance the sliding between adjacent tissue layers has been suggested. A particular type of fibroblasts, embedded in dense fascial tissues, has been proposed as being cells specialized for the biosynthesis of the hyaluronan-rich matrix. Their related activity could be involved in regulating the sliding ability between adjacent muscular connective tissues.

Hyaluronic acid is also a major component of skin, where it is involved in repairing tissue. When skin is exposed to excessive UVB rays, it becomes inflamed (sunburn), and the cells in the dermis stop producing as much hyaluronan and increase the rate of its degradation. Hyaluronan degradation products then accumulate in the skin after UV exposure.

While it is abundant in extracellular matrices, hyaluronan also contributes to tissue hydrodynamics, movement, and proliferation of cells and participates in a number of cell surface receptor interactions, notably those including its primary receptors, CD44 and RHAMM. Upregulation of CD44 itself is widely accepted as a marker of cell activation in lymphocytes. Hyaluronan's contribution to tumor growth may be due to its interaction with CD44. Receptor CD44 participates in cell adhesion interactions required by tumor cells.

Although hyaluronan binds to receptor CD44, there is evidence hyaluronan degradation products transduce their inflammatory signal through toll-like receptor 2 (TLR2), TLR4, or both TLR2 and TLR4 in macrophages and dendritic cells. TLR and hyaluronan play a role in innate immunity.

There are limitations including the in vivo loss of this compound limiting the duration of effect.

=== Wound repair ===
As a major component of the extracellular matrix, hyaluronic acid has a key role in tissue regeneration, inflammation response, and angiogenesis, which are phases of wound repair. As of 2023, however, reviews of its effect on healing for chronic wounds including burns, diabetic foot ulcers or surgical skin repairs show either insufficient evidence or only limited positive clinical research evidence.

There is also some limited evidence to suggest that hyaluronic acid may be beneficial for ulcer healing and may help to a small degree with pain control. Hyaluronic acid combines with water and swells to form a gel, making it useful in skin treatments as a dermal filler for facial wrinkles; its effect lasts for about 6 to 12 months, and treatment has regulatory approval from the US Food and Drug Administration.

=== Granulation ===
Granulation tissue is the perfused, fibrous connective tissue that replaces a fibrin clot in healing wounds. It typically grows from the base of a wound and is able to fill wounds of almost any size as it heals. HA is abundant in granulation tissue matrix. A variety of cell functions that are essential for tissue repair may attribute to this HA-rich network. These functions include facilitation of cell migration into the provisional wound matrix, cell proliferation, and organization of the granulation tissue matrix. Initiation of inflammation is crucial for the formation of granulation tissue; therefore, the pro-inflammatory role of HA as discussed above also contributes to this stage of wound healing.

=== Cell migration ===
Cell migration is essential for the formation of granulation tissue. The early stage of granulation tissue is dominated by a HA-rich extracellular matrix, which is regarded as a conducive environment for the migration of cells into this temporary wound matrix. HA provides an open hydrated matrix that facilitates cell migration, whereas, in the latter scenario, directed migration and control of related cell mechanisms are mediated via the specific cell interaction between HA and cell surface HA receptors. It forms links with several protein kinases associated with cell locomotion, for example, extracellular signal-regulated kinase, focal adhesion kinase, and other non-receptor tyrosine kinases. During fetal development, the migration path through which neural crest cells migrate is rich in HA. HA is closely associated with the cell migration process in granulation tissue matrix, and studies show that cell movement can be inhibited, at least partially, by HA degradation or blocking HA receptor occupancy.

By providing the dynamic force to the cell, HA synthesis has also been shown to associate with cell migration. Basically, HA is synthesized at the plasma membrane and released directly into the extracellular environment. This may contribute to the hydrated microenvironment at sites of synthesis, and is essential for cell migration by facilitating cell detachment.

=== Skin healing ===
HA plays an important role in the normal epidermis. HA also has crucial functions in the re-epithelialization process due to several of its properties. These include being an integral part of the extracellular matrix of basal keratinocytes, which are major constituents of the epidermis; its free-radical scavenging function, and its role in keratinocyte proliferation and migration.

In normal skin, HA is found in relatively high concentrations in the basal layer of the epidermis where proliferating keratinocytes are found. CD44 is collocated with HA in the basal layer of epidermis where additionally it has been shown to be preferentially expressed on plasma membrane facing the HA-rich matrix pouches. Maintaining the extracellular space and providing an open, as well as hydrated, structure for the passage of nutrients are the main functions of HA in epidermis. A report found HA content increases in the presence of retinoic acid (vitamin A). The proposed effects of retinoic acid against skin photo-damage and photoaging may be correlated, at least in part, with an increase of skin HA content, giving rise to increased tissue hydration. It has been suggested that the free-radical scavenging property of HA contributes to protection against solar radiation, supporting the role of CD44 acting as a HA receptor in the epidermis.

Epidermal HA also functions as a manipulator in the process of keratinocyte proliferation, which is essential in normal epidermal function, as well as during reepithelization in tissue repair. In the wound healing process, HA is expressed in the wound margin, in the connective tissue matrix, and collocating with CD44 expression in migrating keratinocytes.

== Medical uses ==
Hyaluronic acid has been FDA-approved to treat osteoarthritis of the knee via intra-articular injection. A 2012 review showed that the quality of studies supporting this use was mostly poor, with a general absence of significant benefits, and that intra-articular injection of HA could possibly cause adverse effects. A 2020 meta-analysis found that intra-articular injection of high molecular weight HA improved both pain and function in people with knee osteoarthritis.

Hyaluronic acid has been used to treat dry eye. Hyaluronic acid is a common ingredient in skin care products. Hyaluronic acid is used as a dermal filler in cosmetic surgery. It is typically injected using either a classic sharp hypodermic needle or a micro-cannula. Hyaluronic acid may be used as a soft tissue filler, including to separate tissues exposed to radiation for prostate cancer. Complications may involve injury to nerves and microvessels, pain, and bruising, with possible side effects including erythema, itching, and vascular occlusion. In some cases, hyaluronic acid fillers can result in a granulomatous foreign body reaction.

== Sources ==
Hyaluronic acid can be made through three main processes: Animal sources, Microbial hyaluronic acid production and chemical synthesis.

HA was originally extracted from bovine vitreous humor (gel from a cows eye) by Meyer and Palmer in 1934. HA was then also isolated from Pig skin, Human skin and rooster’s comb. The most common animal source is rooster’s comb due being a byproduct from the meat industry.

However, challenges such as low yields, high production costs, and ethical issues associated with animal-derived HA has driven the development of microbial production methods for HA.

== Structure ==
Hyaluronic acid is a polymer of disaccharides, which are composed of D-glucuronic acid and N-acetyl-D-glucosamine, linked via alternating β-(1→4) and β-(1→3) glycosidic bonds. Hyaluronic acid can be 25,000 disaccharide repeats in length. Polymers of hyaluronic acid can range in size from 5000 to 20000000 Da in vivo. The average molecular weight in human synovial fluid is 3–4 million Da, and hyaluronic acid purified from human umbilical cord is 3,140,000 Da; other sources mention average molecular weight of 7 million Da for synovial fluid. Hyaluronic acid was once thought to contain silicon, but this was later found to be from contamination in the processing.

Hyaluronic acid is energetically stable, in part because of the stereochemistry of its component disaccharides. Bulky groups on each sugar molecule are in sterically favored positions, whereas the smaller hydrogens assume the less-favorable axial positions.

Hyaluronic acid in aqueous solutions self-associates to form transient clusters in solution. While it is considered a polyelectrolyte polymer chain, hyaluronic acid does not exhibit the polyelectrolyte peak, suggesting the absence of a characteristic length scale between the hyaluronic acid molecules and the emergence of a fractal clustering, which is due to the strong solvation of these molecules.

== Biological synthesis ==
Hyaluronic acid is synthesized by a class of integral membrane proteins called hyaluronan synthases, of which vertebrates have three types: HAS1, HAS2, and HAS3. These enzymes lengthen hyaluronan by repeatedly adding D-glucuronic acid and N-acetyl-D-glucosamine to the nascent polysaccharide as it is extruded via ABC-transporter through the cell membrane into the extracellular space. The term fasciacyte was coined to describe fibroblast-like cells that synthesize HA.

Hyaluronic acid synthesis has been shown to be inhibited by 4-methylumbelliferone (hymecromone), a 7-hydroxy-4-methylcoumarin derivative. This selective inhibition (without inhibiting other glycosaminoglycans) may prove useful in preventing metastasis of malignant tumor cells. There is feedback inhibition of hyaluronan synthesis by low-molecular-weight hyaluronan (<500 kDa) at high concentrations, but there is stimulation by high-molecular-weight hyaluronan (>500 kDa) when tested in cultured human synovial fibroblasts.

Bacillus subtilis recently has been genetically modified to culture a proprietary formula to yield hyaluronans, in a patented process producing human-grade product.

=== Fasciacyte ===
A fasciacyte is a type of biological cell that produces hyaluronan-rich extracellular matrix and modulates the gliding of muscle fasciae.

Fasciacytes are fibroblast-like cells found in fasciae. They are round-shaped with rounder nuclei and have less elongated cellular processes when compared with fibroblasts. Fasciacytes are clustered along the upper and lower surfaces of a fascial layer.

Fasciacytes produce hyaluronan, which regulates fascial gliding.

== Biosynthetic mechanism ==
Hyaluronic acid (HA) is a linear glycosaminoglycan (GAG), an anionic, gel-like, polymer, found in the extracellular matrix of epithelial and connective tissues of vertebrates. It is part of a family of structurally complex, linear, anionic polysaccharides. The carboxylate groups present in the molecule make it negatively charged, therefore allowing for successful binding to water, and making it valuable to cosmetic and pharmaceutical products.

HA consists of repeating β4-glucuronic acid (GlcUA)-β3-N-acetylglucosamine (GlcNAc) disaccharides, and is synthesized by hyaluronan synthases (HAS), a class of integral membrane proteins that produce the well-defined, uniform chain lengths characteristic to HA. There are three existing types of HASs in vertebrates: HAS1, HAS2, HAS3; each of these contribute to elongation of the HA polymer. For an HA capsule to be created, this enzyme must be present because it polymerizes UDP-sugar precursors into HA. HA precursors are synthesized by first phosphorylating glucose by hexokinase, yielding glucose-6-phosphate, which is the main HA precursor. Then, two routes are taken to synthesize UDP-n-acetylglucosamine and UDP-glucuronic acid which both react to form HA. Glucose-6-phosphate gets converted to either fructose-6-phosphate with hasE (phosphoglucoisomerase), or glucose-1-phosphate using pgm (α-phosphoglucomutase), where those both undergo different sets of reactions.

UDP-glucuronic acid and UDP-n-acetylglucosamine get bound together to form HA via hasA (HA synthase).

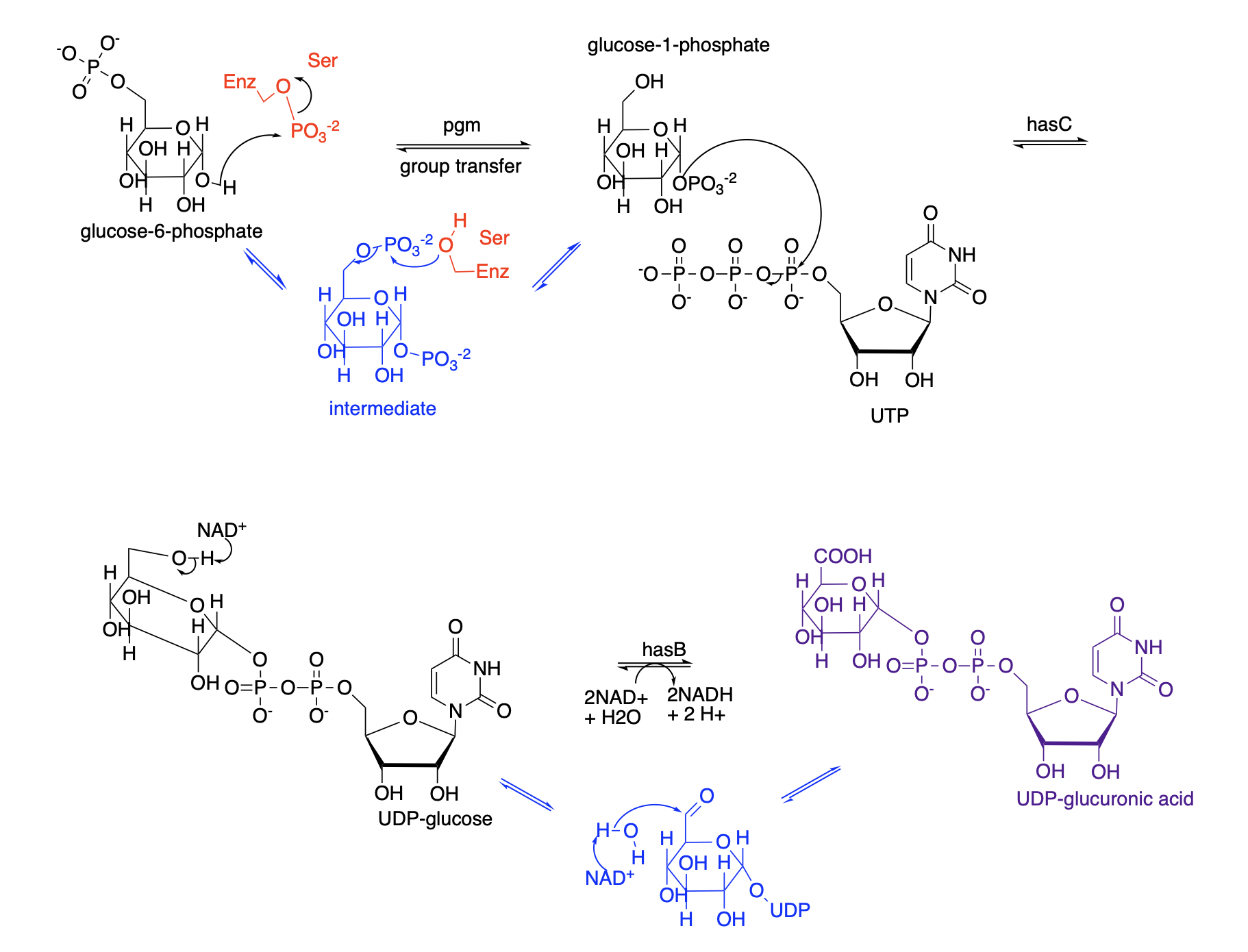
Precursor 1: Synthesis of UDP-Glucuronic Acid

=== Synthesis of UDP-glucuronic acid ===
UDP-glucuronic acid is formed from hasC (UDP-glucose pyrophosphorylase) converting glucose-1-P into UDP-glucose, which then reacts with hasB (UDP-glucose dehydrogenase) to form UDP-glucuronic acid.

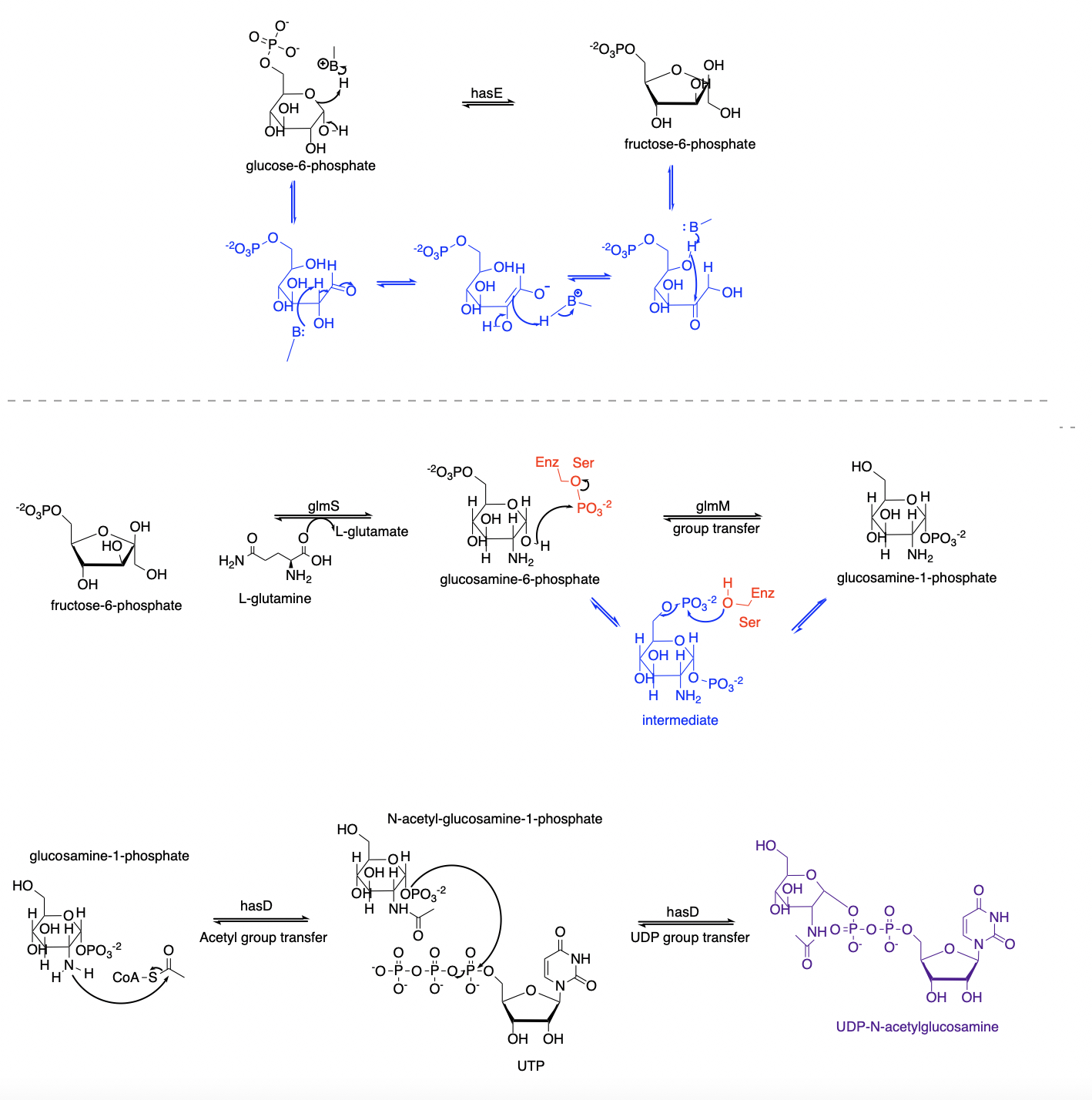
Precursor 2: Synthesis of UDP-N-Acetylglucosamine

=== Synthesis of N-acetyl glucosamine ===
The path forward from fructose-6-P utilizes glmS (amidotransferase) to form glucosamine-6-P. Then, glmM (Mutase) reacts with this product to form glucosamine-1-P. hasD (acetyltransferase) converts this into n-acetylglucosamine-1-P, and finally, hasD (pyrophosphorylase) converts this product into UDP-n-acetylglucosamine.

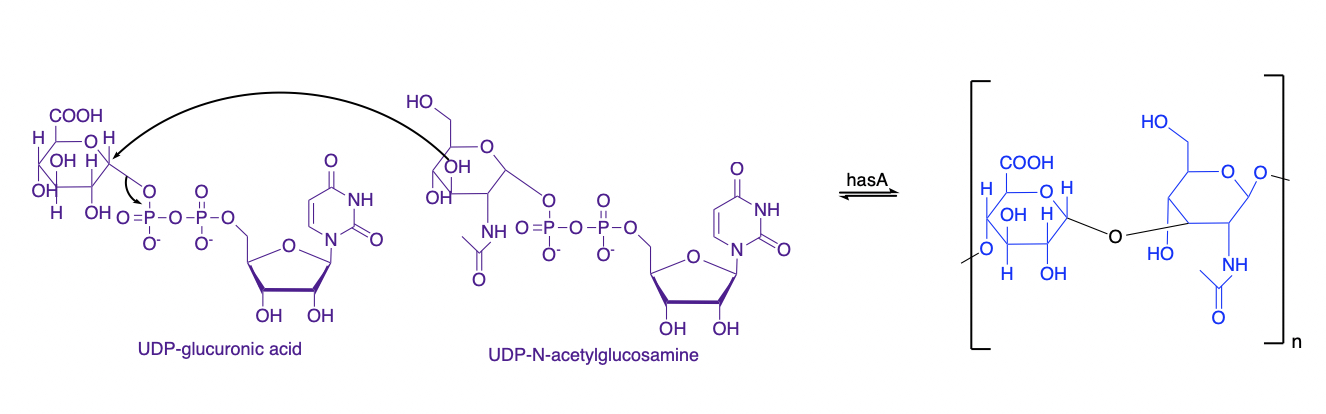
Final step of HA Synthesis

=== Final step: Two disaccharides form hyaluronic acid ===
UDP-glucuronic acid and UDP-n-acetylglucosamine get bound together to form HA via hasA (HA synthase), completing the synthesis.

== Degradation ==
Hyaluronic acid can be degraded by a family of enzymes called hyaluronidases. In humans, there are at least seven types of hyaluronidase-like enzymes, several of which are tumor suppressors. The degradation products of hyaluronan, the oligosaccharides and very low-molecular-weight hyaluronan, exhibit pro-angiogenic properties. In addition, recent studies showed hyaluronan fragments, not the native high-molecular weight molecule, can induce inflammatory responses in macrophages and dendritic cells in tissue injury and in skin transplant.

Hyaluronan can also be degraded via non-enzymatic reactions. These include acidic and alkaline hydrolysis, ultrasonic disintegration, thermal decomposition, and degradation by oxidants.

== Etymology ==
The term hyaluronic acid is derived from hyalos (Greek for vitreous, meaning 'glass-like') and uronic acid because it was first isolated from the vitreous humour and possesses a high uronic acid content. The term hyaluronate refers to the conjugate base of hyaluronic acid. Since the molecule typically exists in vivo in its polyanionic form, it is most commonly referred to as hyaluronan.

== History ==
Hyaluronic acid was first obtained by Karl Meyer and John Palmer in 1934 from the vitreous body in a cow's eye. The first hyaluronan biomedical product, Healon, was developed in the 1970s and 1980s by Pharmacia, and approved for use in eye surgery (i.e., corneal transplantation, cataract surgery, glaucoma surgery, and surgery to repair retinal detachment). Other biomedical companies also produce brands of hyaluronan for ophthalmic surgery.

Native hyaluronic acid has a relatively short half-life (shown in rabbits) so various manufacturing techniques have been deployed to extend the length of the chain and stabilise the molecule for its use in medical applications. The introduction of protein-based cross-links, the introduction of free-radical scavenging molecules such as sorbitol, and minimal stabilisation of the HA chains through chemical agents such as NASHA (non-animal stabilised hyaluronic acid) are all techniques that have been used to preserve its shelf life.

In the late 1970s, intraocular lens implantation was often followed by severe corneal edema, due to endothelial cell damage during the surgery. It was evident that a viscous, clear, physiologic lubricant to prevent such scraping of the endothelial cells was needed.

== Other animals ==
Hyaluronan is used in treatment of articular disorders in horses, in particular those in competition or heavy work. It is indicated for carpal and fetlock joint dysfunctions, but not when joint sepsis or fracture are suspected. It is especially used for synovitis associated with equine osteoarthritis. It can be injected directly into an affected joint, or intravenously for less localized disorders. It may cause mild heating of the joint if directly injected, but this does not affect the clinical outcome. Intra-articularly administered medicine is fully metabolized in less than a week.

According to Canadian regulation, hyaluronan in HY-50 preparation should not be administered to animals to be slaughtered for horse meat. In Europe, however, the same preparation is not considered to have any such effect, and edibility of the horse meat is not affected.

== Research ==
Due to its accumulation in airway epithelial cells in various respiratory diseases, such as COVID-19, cystic fibrosis, influenza, and sepsis, hyaluronic acid is under study as a possible mediator of lung inflammatory mechanisms, as of 2022.

The high biocompatibility of hyaluronic acid and its common presence in the extracellular matrix of tissues indicate its possible use as a biomaterial scaffold in tissue engineering. In particular, research groups have found hyaluronan's properties for tissue engineering and regenerative medicine may be improved with cross-linking, producing a hydrogel. Crosslinking may allow a desired shape, as well as to deliver therapeutic molecules into a host. Hyaluronan can be crosslinked by attaching thiols (see thiomers) (trade names: Extracel, HyStem), hexadecylamides (trade name: Hymovis), and tyramines (trade name: Corgel). Hyaluronan can also be crosslinked directly with formaldehyde (trade name: Hylan-A) or with divinylsulfone (trade name: Hylan-B). Hyaluronic acid can also be crosslinked with a bifunctional crosslinking agent 1,4-Butanediol diglycidyl ether (BDDE) using a ResonantAcoustic mixer over a period of time ranging from about 1 minute to about 10 minutes.

Due to its ability to regulate angiogenesis by stimulating endothelial cells to proliferate in vitro, hyaluronan can be used to create hydrogels to study vascular morphogenesis.

Research shows that abnormal hyaluronic acid (HA) metabolism is a major factor in tumor progression. HA and HA fragment-tumor cell interaction could activate the downstream signaling pathways, promoting cell proliferation, adhesion, migration and invasion, and inducing angiogenesis, lymphangiogenesis, epithelial-mesenchymal transition, stem cell-like property, and chemoradioresistance in digestive cancers.

== Chemical Modifications ==
The general purpose of HA modifications is to improve certain properties such as biocompatibility, permeation, and sustained drug release. It can also be modified to test the functionality of certain groups, such as the carboxyl or hydroxyl groups. These improvements to HA are achieved through cross-linking and bioconjugation with various molecules, such as acid derivatives, ketones, aldehydes, biopolymers, and probes.

There are three sites on HA that can be modified: the Carboxylic acid group (COOH), the hydroxyl group (OH), and the N-acetyl group (NHCOH3). Modifications of the carboxylic acid group include amidation, Ugi condensation, and ester formation. Modifications of the hydroxyl group include ether formation, hemiacetal formation, ester formation, carbamate formation, and oxidation with sodium periodate. Modifications of the N-acetyl group include deacetylation, followed by amidation or Ugi condensation.

=== Carboxylic Acid Modifications (COOH) ===
==== Amidation ====
HA can be conjugated with polymers and probes at the carboxyl group using an amidation reaction involving 1-ethyl-3-[3-(dimethylamino)-propyl]-carbodiimide (EDC) and N-Hydroxysuccinimide (NHS). This reaction occurs in water and is used to form more hydrolysis-resistant, non-rearrangeable intermediates that prevent the formation of the irreversible N-acyl urea byproduct, preventing amide bond formation.

The amide group in this reaction can also be modified to contain a thiol group, which allows thiols to be covalently linked to HA. Thiol modification can improve many HA properties such as biocompatibility, permeation, and sustained release of a drug. This is because in the presence of biological components, thiols display a great amount of chemo-selectivity and ability to cross-link.

==== Ugi Condensation ====
An Ugi condensation reaction can also be used at the carboxyl group using diamine, formaldehyde, and cyclohexyl isocyanide at a low pH. This reaction produces diamide linkages between the polysaccharide chains.

==== Esterification ====
HA can be reacted with an epoxide such as glycidyl methacrylate and triethylamine in water to form these ester bonds. Alkyl halides, tosylates, and diazomethane can also be used to create ester bonds, but this reaction requires you to convert the native HA sodium salt to its TBA salt, which can be time consuming. These esterification reactions at the carboxyl group usually require a low pH. There are many different types of esterification reactions at both the carboxyl and hydroxyl groups.

=== Hydroxyl Modifications (OH) ===
==== Esterification ====
HA can form ester bonds at the hydroxyl groups in the glycidyl methacrylate reaction, but that reaction is reversible while the carboxylic epoxide esterification is not. Some esterification reactions can be faster in the hydroxy group vs the carboxy group (6h vs 24h). However, many esterification reactions at the hydroxy group require very high pH (>10).

Ether Formation

Common methods of ether formation are via epoxide opening such as with butanediol-diglycidyl ether (BDDE) or 1,2,3,4-diepoxybutane, as well as other crosslinkers like divinyl sulfone (DVS) and ethylene sulfide. These ether linkages are stable to hydrolysis, providing long term integrity.

=== N-acetyl Modifications (NHCOH3) ===
Deacetylation

Modifications of the N-acetyl group first involve deacetylation, which yields an amino group. Deacetylation is usually achieved by hydrazinolysis of HA using hydrazine sulfate. However, this can lead to fragmentation of the HA molecule and so, modifications for this site are not preferred.

==== Amidation ====
After deacetylation, the amino group, can then react with a variety of electrophiles or with a carboxylic acid using amidation.

==== Ugi Condensation ====
The amine groups of deacetylated HA can also be used for cross-linking using Ugi condensation.

== See also ==
- Sodium hyaluronate, the sodium salt of hyaluronic acid, a glycosaminoglycan found in various human connective tissue.
- Microbial hyaluronic acid production, the process by which microorganisms are utilized in fermentation to synthesize hyaluronic acid.
- Alguronic acid, trade name for a mix of polysaccharides produced by microalgae. Inhibits production of hyaluronic-acid-degrading enzymes.
- Bloomage, a biomaterial company based in China, primarily specialized in hyaluronic acid and other bioactive substance products.
