= Mucinosis =

- Specialty: Dermatology

Mucinoses are a group of cutaneous diseases caused by fibroblasts producing abnormally large amounts of acid mucopolysaccharides (i.e. mucin), usually hyaluronic acid.

Cutaneous mucinosis is a group of conditions involving an accumulation of mucin or glycosaminoglycan in the skin and its annexes. It is described in some connective tissue diseases but never in association with mixed connective tissue disease.

== See also ==
- Skin lesion
- List of cutaneous conditions
