= Glycosaminoglycan =

Polysaccharides found in animal tissue

Glycosaminoglycans (GAGs, formerly mucopolysaccharides) are linear polysaccharides of repeating disaccharide (two-sugar) units, consisting of one uronic sugar and one amino sugar. They are an evolutionarily ancient component of the extracellular matrix and connective tissues in the kingdom Animalia, with the most basal group featuring true GAGs being the genus Hydra. Due to their strong negative charge making them highly hydrophilic, they are abundant in body plan elements providing lubrication or cushioning, such as mucous membranes or cartilage. They are not found in plants, but exist in more limited contexts in bacteria, with similar backbone structures to animal GAGs but without the typical core proteins and located only on the inner surface of cytoplasmic membranes, suggesting a likely separate evolutionary origin. In the metabolic disorders known as mucopolysaccharidoses, abnormal accumulations of glycosaminoglycans occur due to enzyme deficiencies.

== Evolution ==
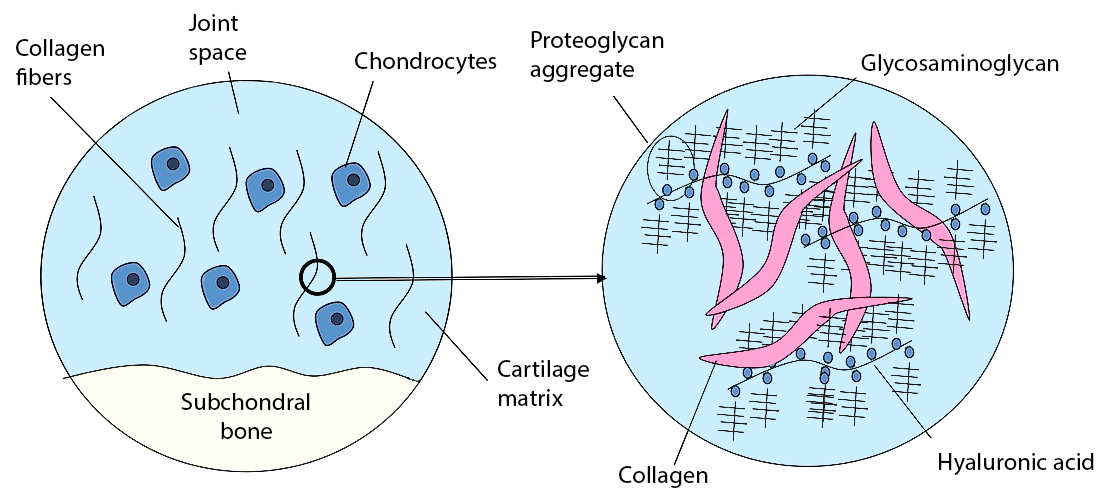
Generalized presence of GAGs in the extracellular matrix, see here as the horizontal lines bound to proteoglycan core proteins.

== Synthesis ==
Glycosaminoglycans vary greatly in molecular mass, disaccharide structure, and sulfation. This is because GAG synthesis is not template driven, as are proteins or nucleic acids, but is constantly altered by processing enzymes.

GAGs are classified into four groups, based on their core disaccharide structures:

1. Heparin/heparan sulfate (HSGAGs)
2. Chondroitin sulfate/dermatan sulfate (CSGAGs) which along with HSGAGs are synthesized in the Golgi apparatus, where core proteins, made in the rough endoplasmic reticulum, are post-translationally modified via O-linked glycosylation by glycosyltransferases, thus forming proteoglycans.
3. Keratan sulfate which may modify core proteins through N-linked glycosylation or O-linked glycosylation of the proteoglycan
4. Hyaluronic acid (also known as hyaluronan), which is synthesized by integral membrane synthases, which immediately secrete the dynamically elongated disaccharide chain.

=== HSGAG and CSGAG ===
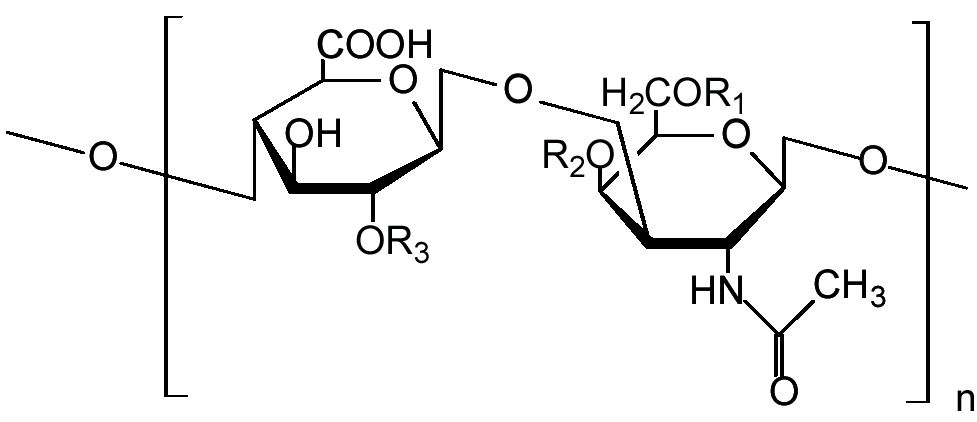
The repeating disaccharide unit (GlcUA(1β→3)GalNAc(1β→4))_{n} of chondroitin sulfate. For polysaccharide nomenclature see here. R_{1}, R_{2}, R_{3} may have different values.

HSGAG and CSGAG modified proteoglycans first begin with a consensus Ser-Gly/Ala-X-Gly motif in the core protein. Construction of a tetrasaccharide linker that consists of -GlcAβ1–3Galβ1–3Galβ1–4Xylβ1-O-(Ser)-, where xylosyltransferase, β4-galactosyl transferase (GalTI), β3-galactosyl transferase (GalT-II), and β3-GlcA transferase (GlcAT-I) transfer the four monosaccharides, begins synthesis of the GAG modified protein. The first modification of the tetrasaccharide linker determines whether the HSGAGs or CSGAGs will be added. Addition of a GlcNAc promotes the addition of HSGAGs while addition of GalNAc to the tetrasaccharide linker promotes CSGAG development. GlcNAcT-I transfers GlcNAc to the tetrasaccahride linker, which is distinct from glycosyltransferase GlcNAcT-II, the enzyme that is utilized to build HSGAGs. EXTL2 and EXTL3, two genes in the EXT tumor suppressor family, have been shown to have GlcNAcT-I activity. Conversely, GalNAc is transferred to the linker by the enzyme GalNAcT to initiate synthesis of CSGAGs, an enzyme which may or may not have distinct activity compared to the GalNAc transferase activity of chondroitin synthase.

With regard to HSGAGs, a multimeric enzyme encoded by EXT1 and EXT2 of the EXT family of genes, transfers both GlcNAc and GlcA for HSGAG chain elongation. While elongating, the HSGAG is dynamically modified, first by N-deacetylase, N-sulfotransferase (NDST1), which is a bifunctional enzyme that cleaves the N-acetyl group from GlcNAc and subsequently sulfates the N-position. Next, C-5 uronyl epimerase coverts d-GlcA to l-IdoA followed by 2-O sulfation of the uronic acid sugar by 2-O sulfotransferase (Heparan sulfate 2-O-sulfotransferase). Finally, the 6-O and 3-O positions of GlcNAc moities are sulfated by 6-O (Heparan sulfate 6-O-sulfotransferase) and 3-O (3-OST) sulfotransferases.

Chondroitin sulfate and dermatan sulfate, which comprise CSGAGs, are differentiated from each other by the presence of GlcA and IdoA epimers respectively. Similar to the production of HSGAGs, C-5 uronyl epimerase converts d-GlcA to l-IdoA to synthesize dermatan sulfate. Three sulfation events of the CSGAG chains occur: 4-O and/or 6-O sulfation of GalNAc and 2-O sulfation of uronic acid. Four isoforms of the 4-O GalNAc sulfotransferases (C4ST-1, C4ST-2, C4ST-3, and D4ST-1) and three isoforms of the GalNAc 6-O sulfotransferases (C6ST, C6ST-2, and GalNAc4S-6ST) are responsible for the sulfation of GalNAc.

=== Keratan sulfate types ===
Repeating disaccharide unit of keratan sulfate.

Unlike HSGAGs and CSGAGs, the third class of GAGs, those belonging to keratan sulfate types, are driven towards biosynthesis through particular protein sequence motifs. For example, in the cornea and cartilage, the keratan sulfate domain of aggrecan consists of a series of tandemly repeated hexapeptides with a consensus sequence of E(E/L)PFPS. Additionally, for three other keratan sulfated proteoglycans, lumican, keratocan, and mimecan (OGN), the consensus sequence NX(T/S) along with protein secondary structure was determined to be involved in N-linked oligosaccharide extension with keratan sulfate. Keratan sulfate elongation begins at the nonreducing ends of three linkage oligosaccharides, which define the three classes of keratan sulfate. Keratan sulfate I (KSI) is N -linked via a high mannose type precursor oligosaccharide. Keratan sulfate II (KSII) and keratan sulfate III (KSIII) are O-linked, with KSII linkages identical to that of mucin core structure, and KSIII linked to a 2-O mannose. Elongation of the keratan sulfate polymer occurs through the glycosyltransferase addition of Gal and GlcNAc. Galactose addition occurs primarily through the β-1,4-galactosyltransferase enzyme (β4Gal-T1) while the enzymes responsible for β-3-Nacetylglucosamine have not been clearly identified. Finally, sulfation of the polymer occurs at the 6-position of both sugar residues. The enzyme KS-Gal6ST (CHST1) transfers sulfate groups to galactose while N-acetylglucosaminyl-6-sulfotransferase (GlcNAc6ST) (CHST2) transfers sulfate groups to terminal GlcNAc in keratan sulfate.

=== Hyaluronic acid class ===
Repeating disaccharide unit (-4GlcUAβ1-3GlcNAcβ1-)_{n} of hyaluronan

The fourth class of GAG, hyaluronic acid (HA), is not sulfated and is synthesized by three transmembrane synthase proteins HAS1, HAS2, and HAS3. HA, a linear polysaccharide, is composed of repeating disaccharide units of →4)GlcAβ(1→3)GlcNAcβ(1→ and has a very high molecular mass, ranging from 10^{5} to 10^{7} Da. Each HAS enzyme is capable of transglycosylation when supplied with UDP-GlcA and UDP-GlcNAc. HAS2 is responsible for very large hyaluronic acid polymers, while smaller sizes of HA are synthesized by HAS1 and HAS3. While each HAS isoform catalyzes the same biosynthetic reaction, each HAS isoform is independently active. HAS isoforms have also been shown to have differing K_{m} values for UDP-GlcA and UDPGlcNAc. It is believed that through differences in enzyme activity and expression, the wide spectrum of biological functions mediated by HA can be regulated, such as its involvement with neural stem cell regulation in the subgranular zone of the brain.

== Pharmacodynamics ==
=== HSGAGs ===
Endogenous heparin is localized and stored in secretory granules of mast cells. Histamine that is present within the granules is protonated (H_{2}A^{2+}) at pH within granules (5.2–6.0), thus it is believed that heparin, which is highly negatively charged, functions to electrostatically retain and store histamine. In the clinic, heparin is administered as an anticoagulant and is also the first line choice for thromboembolic diseases. Heparan sulfate (HS) has numerous biological activities and functions, including cell adhesion, regulation of cell growth and proliferation, developmental processes, cell surface binding of lipoprotein lipase and other proteins, angiogenesis, viral invasion, and tumor metastasis.

CSGAGs interact with heparin binding proteins, specifically dermatan sulfate interactions with fibroblast growth factor FGF-2 and FGF-7 have been implicated in cellular proliferation and wound repair while interactions with hepatic growth factor/scatter factor (HGF/SF) activate the HGF/SF signaling pathway (c-Met) through its receptor. CSGAGs are important in providing support and adhesiveness in bone, skin, and cartilage. Other biological functions for which CSGAGs are known to play critical functions in include inhibition of axonal growth and regeneration in CNS development, roles in brain development, neuritogenic activity, and pathogen infection.

=== Keratan sulfates ===
One of the main functions of the third class of GAGs, keratan sulfates, is the maintenance of tissue hydration. Keratan sulfates are in the bone, cartilage, and the cornea of the eye. Within the normal cornea, dermatan sulfate is fully hydrated whereas keratan sulfate is only partially hydrated suggesting that keratan sulfate may behave as a dynamically controlled buffer for hydration. In disease states such as macular corneal dystrophy, in which GAGs levels such as KS are altered, loss of hydration within the corneal stroma is believed to be the cause of corneal haze, thus supporting the long-held hypothesis that corneal transparency is dependent on proper levels of keratan sulfate. Keratan sulfate GAGs are found in many other tissues besides the cornea, where they are known to regulate macrophage adhesion, form barriers to neurite growth, regulate embryo implantation in the endometrial uterine lining during menstrual cycles, and affect the motility of corneal endothelial cells. In summary, KS plays an anti-adhesive role, which suggests very important functions of KS in cell motility and attachment as well as other potential biological processes.

=== Dermatan sulfates ===
Dermatan sulfates function in the skin, tendons, blood vessels, and heart valves.

=== Hyaluronic acid ===
Hyaluronic acid is a major component of synovial tissues and fluid, as well as the ground substance of other connective tissues. Hyaluronic acid binds cells together, lubricates joints, and helps maintain the shape of the eyeballs. The viscoelasticity of hyaluronic acid makes it ideal for lubricating joints and surfaces that move along each other, such as cartilage. A solution of hyaluronic acid under low shear stress has a much higher viscosity than while under high shear stress. Hyaluronidase, an enzyme produced by white blood cells, sperms cells, and some bacteria, breaks apart the hyaluronic acid, causing the solution to become more liquid.

In vivo, hyaluronic acid forms randomly kinked coils that entangle to form a hyaluronan network, slowing diffusion and forming a diffusion barrier that regulates transport of substances between cells. For example, hyaluronan helps partition plasma proteins between vascular and extravascular spaces, which affects solubility of macromolecules in the interstitium, changes chemical equilibria, and stabilizes the structure of collagen fibers. Other functions include matrix interactions with hyaluronan binding proteins such as hyaluronectin, glial hyaluronan binding protein, brain enriched hyaluronan binding protein, collagen VI, TSG-6, and inter-alpha-trypsin inhibitor. Cell surface interactions involving hyaluronan are its well-known coupling with CD44, which may be related to tumor progression, and also with RHAMM (Hyaluronan-mediated motility receptor), which has been implicated in developmental processes, tumor metastasis, and pathological reparative processes.

Fibroblasts, mesothelial cells, and certain types of stem cells surround themselves in a pericellular "coat", part of which is constructed from hyaluronan, in order to shield themselves from bacteria, red blood cells, or other matrix molecules. For example, in regard to stem cells, hyaluronan, along with chondroitin sulfate, helps to form the stem cell niche. Stem cells are protected from the effects of growth factors by a shield of hyaluronan and minimally sulfated chondroitin sulfate. During progenitor division, the daughter cell moves outside of this pericellular shield where it can then be influenced by growth factors to differentiate even further.

== Classification ==
Members of the glycosaminoglycan family vary in the type of hexosamine, hexose or hexuronic acid unit they contain (e.g. glucuronic acid, iduronic acid, galactose, galactosamine, glucosamine).

They also vary in the geometry of the glycosidic linkage.

Examples of GAGs include:

Name	Hexuronic acid or hexose (for keratan)	Hexosamine	Linkage geometry between predominant monomeric units	Unique features
Chondroitin sulfate	GlcUA or GlcUA(2S)	GalNAc or GalNAc(4S) or GalNAc(6S) or GalNAc(4S,6S)	GlcUAβ(1→3)GalNAcβ(1→4)	Most prevalent GAG
Dermatan sulfate	GlcUA or IdoUA or IdoUA(2S)	GalNAc or GalNAc(4S) or GalNAc(6S) or GalNAc(4S,6S)	'IdoUAβ1-3'GalNAcβ1-4	Distinguished from chondroitin sulfate by the presence of iduronic acid, although some hexuronic acid monosaccharides may be glucuronic acid.
Keratan sulfate	Gal or Gal(6S)	GlcNAc or GlcNAc(6S)	-Gal(6S)β1-4GlcNAc(6S)β1-3	Keratan sulfate type II may be fucosylated.
Heparin	GlcUA or IdoUA(2S)	GlcNAc or GlcNS or GlcNAc(6S) or GlcNS(6S)	-IdoUA(2S)α1-4GlcNS(6S)α1-4	Highest negative charge density of any known biological molecule
Heparan sulfate	GlcUA or IdoUA or IdoUA(2S)	GlcNAc or GlcNS or GlcNAc(6S) or GlcNS(6S)	-GlcUAβ1-4GlcNAcα1-4	Highly similar in structure to heparin, however heparan sulfate's disaccharide units are organised into distinct sulfated and non-sulfated domains.
Hyaluronan	GlcUA	GlcNAc	-GlcUAβ1-3GlcNAcβ1-4	The only GAG that is exclusively non-sulfated

=== Abbreviations ===
- GlcUA = β-D-glucuronic acid
- GlcUA(2S) = 2-O-sulfo-β-D-glucuronic acid
- IdoUA = α-L-iduronic acid
- IdoUA(2S) = 2-O-sulfo-α-L-iduronic acid
- Gal = β-D-galactose
- Gal(6S) = 6-O-sulfo-β-D-galactose
- GalNAc = β-D-N-acetylgalactosamine
- GalNAc(4S) = β-D-N-acetylgalactosamine-4-O-sulfate
- GalNAc(6S) = β-D-N-acetylgalactosamine-6-O-sulfate
- GalNAc(4S,6S) = β-D-N-acetylgalactosamine-4-O, 6-O-sulfate
- GlcNAc = α-D-N-acetylglucosamine
- GlcNAc(6S) = α-D-N-acetylglucosamine-6-O-sulfate
- GlcNS = α-D-N-sulfoglucosamine
- GlcNS(6S) = α-D-N-sulfoglucosamine-6-O-sulfate

== See also ==
- Glycoprotein – Protein with oligosaccharide modifications
- Lipopolysaccharide – Class of molecules found in the outer membrane of Gram-negative bacteria
- Snail slime – External bodily secretion produced by snails
- Glycocalyx – Carbohydrate-rich layer at the periphery of a cell Pericellular coat.
