= Boutonniere deformity =

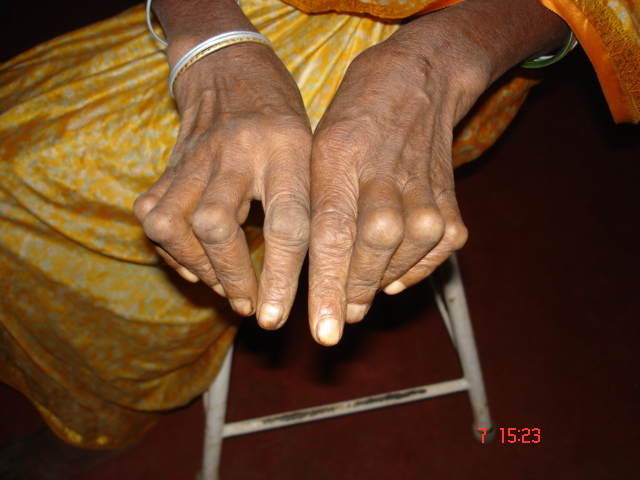
- Boutonniere deformity in a person with rheumatoid arthritis
- Specialty: Rheumatology

Boutonniere deformity is a deformed position of the fingers or toes, in which the joint nearest the knuckle (the proximal interphalangeal joint, or PIP) is permanently bent toward the palm while the furthest joint (the distal interphalangeal joint, or DIP) is bent back away (PIP flexion with DIP hyperextension). Causes include injury, inflammatory conditions like rheumatoid arthritis, psoriatic arthritis, and genetic conditions such as Ehlers–Danlos syndrome.

== Pathophysiology ==
This flexion deformity of the proximal interphalangeal joint is due to interruption of the central slip of the extensor tendon such that the lateral slips separate and the head of the proximal phalanx pops through the gap like a finger through a button hole (thus the name, from French boutonnière "button hole"). The distal joint is subsequently drawn into hyperextension because the two peripheral slips of the extensor tendon are stretched by the head of the proximal phalanx (note that the two peripheral slips are inserted into the distal phalanx, while the proximal slip is inserted into the middle phalanx). This deformity makes it difficult or impossible to extend the proximal interphalangeal joint.

== Diagnosis ==
=== Stages ===
1. Mild extension lag, passively correctable
2. Moderate extension lag, passively correctable
3. Mild flexion contracture
4. Advanced flexion contracture

Higher numbers indicate a more severe problem and greater likelihood of a poor outcome.

== Treatment ==
Usually treated with a splint placing the proximal interphalangeal joint in extension for 4–6 weeks. Surgery is occasionally needed when splinting fails.

== See also ==
- Swan neck deformity
- Z-deformity
