= Kyphoscoliosis =

Abnormal spinal curvature in the coronal and sagittal planes

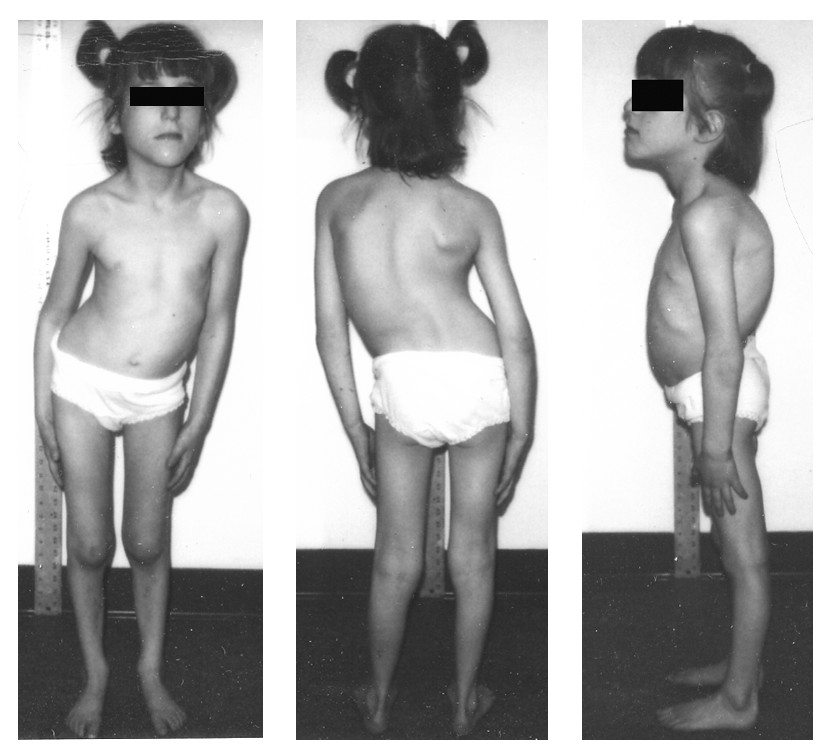
- Kyphoscoliosis in a 10-year-old girl with HSANIII.
- Specialty: Orthopedic

Kyphoscoliosis describes an abnormal curvature of the spine in both the coronal and sagittal planes. It is a combination of kyphosis and scoliosis. This musculoskeletal disorder often leads to other issues in patients, such as under-ventilation of lungs, pulmonary hypertension, difficulty in performing day-to-day activities, and psychological issues emanating from anxiety about acceptance among peers, especially in young patients. It can also be seen in syringomyelia, Friedreich's ataxia, spina bifida, kyphoscoliotic Ehlers–Danlos syndrome (kEDS), and Duchenne muscular dystrophy due to asymmetric weakening of the paraspinal muscles.

== Signs and symptoms ==
A person with kyphoscoliosis may exhibit an abnormal hunch along with the presence of an S or C-like shape, the presence of associated disorders like hypertension and neurological disorders, or an abnormal gait.

=== Kyphosis ===
Kyphosis by itself refers to an excessive convex curvature of the spine occurring in the thoracic and sacral regions. A normal thoracic curvature from the 1st to the 12th vertebra has a naturally occurring convex shape with angles ranging from 20 degrees to 45 degrees. When the curvature exceeds 45 degrees, the condition is termed kyphosis.

Kyphosis, depending on the extent of curvature, can result in several symptoms including breathing and digestion difficulties, cardiovascular issues, and neurological issues.

There are several forms of kyphosis, including postural (related to slouching), Scheuermann's kyphosis (found mostly in teenagers), congenital, nutritional, osteoporosis-induced and post-traumatic.

Depending on the type of kyphosis, the extent of curvature, the age of the patient, different treatments may be recommended, including the provision for posture correction, braces, physiotherapy, and surgery. Surgery can be most useful in patients who have an extensive deformity. The rate of post-surgery complications may be higher in elderly patients.

=== Scoliosis ===
Scoliosis refers to a form of abnormal spinal curvature in which the person's spine takes an S or C shape. Scoliosis has forms of treatments available similar to those for kyphosis including bracing, physical therapy and various types of surgeries. Typically, a human spine is straight laterally, but in scoliosis patients, there may be curves of ten degrees or more in either direction, left or right.

== Cause ==
Kyphoscoliosis may manifest in an individual at different stages of life and for various causes. When present at a young age ranging from childhood to teenage, kyphoscoliosis may be present from birth due to congenital abnormalities including spina bifida.

Certain infections can also lead to the development of kyphoscoliosis such as vertebral or general tuberculosis. Osteochondrodysplasia, a disorder related to the development of bone and cartilage, can also cause this disease.

At later ages, kyphoscoliosis can occur in patients with chronic degenerative diseases like osteoporosis and osteoarthritis. This type of incidence is usually seen in patients above 50 years of age and is mainly attributed to structural changes in the spine and adjoining tissues. Sometimes, a traumatic injury can also lead to its development.

Further, there are many idiopathic occurrences of kyphoscoliosis where the exact cause is not very well known but is suspected to be caused by genetic factors.

== Diagnosis ==
Kyphoscoliosis is one of the main criteria in kyphoscoliotic Ehlers–Danlos syndrome. It is caused by a mutation in the PLOD1 gene or FKBP14 gene. The diagnosis is confirmed by molecular testing and suggested when a patient meets criteria 1 and criteria 2: congenital muscle hypotonia and congenital or early onset kyphoscoliosis (progressive or non-progressive), respectively.

== Treatments ==
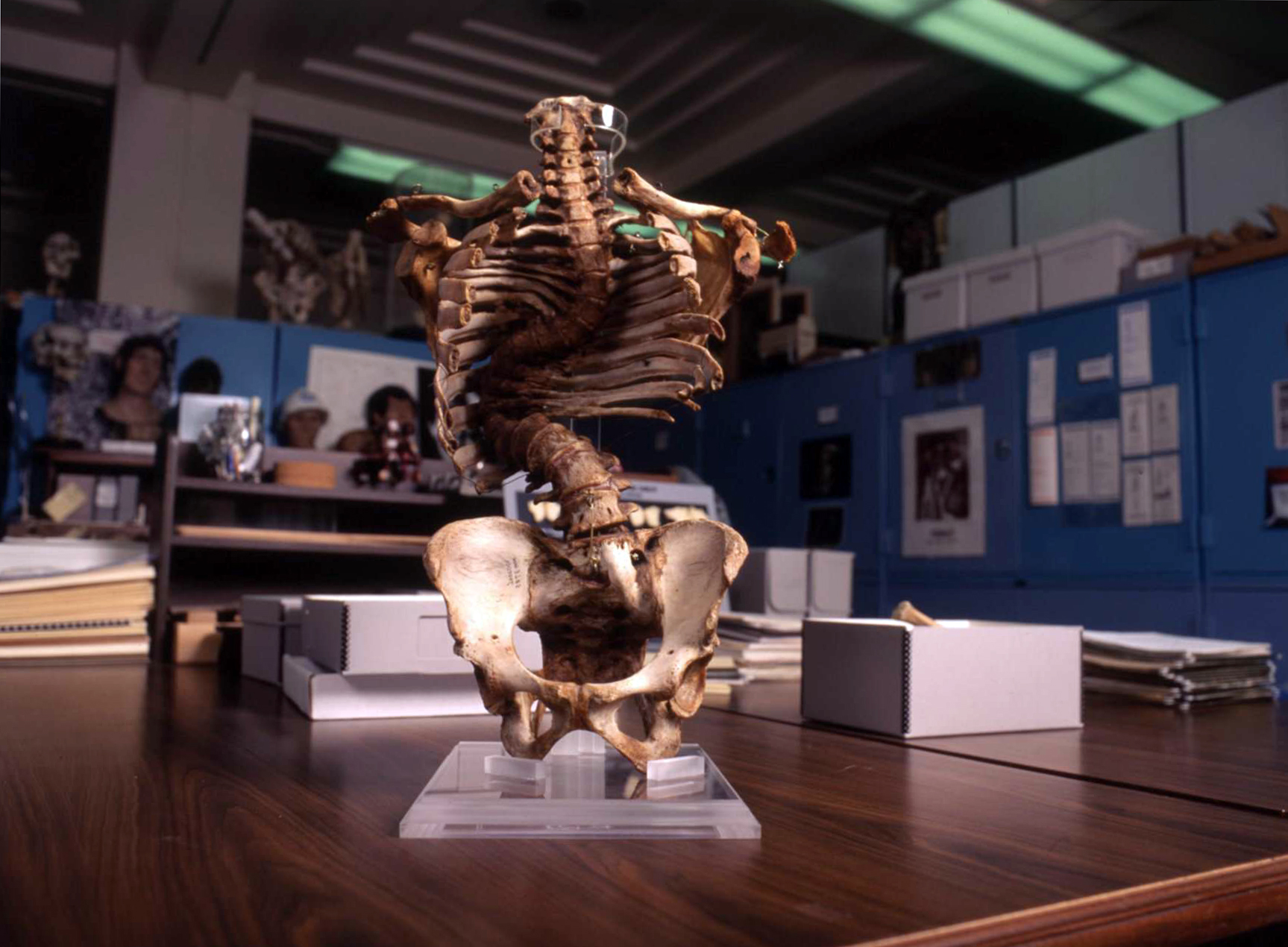
Skeletal specimen of adult female showing kyphoscoliosis (curvature of the spine), 1830–1860. Photographer: Kikel, V. R.

The decision to choose a particular treatment approach depends on multiple factors such as the age of the patient, understanding the root cause of the condition (i.e. postural, congenital, etc.), and risks involved in surgery for the patient. In addition to the below treatments, oxygen may be necessary in the long term for patients with significant hypoxemia.

=== Physical therapy ===
When the extent of curvature is mild and the underlying cause is bad posture, then physical therapy becomes the first line of treatment. Physical therapy may also be advised for other causes as well, to delay the development of abnormal curvatures, such as in the case of elderly patients with a degenerative disease of bones and cartilage. The primary objective of physical therapy is to strengthen the spinal tissues for either correcting the curvature to the maximum extent possible or limiting further damage.

=== Back braces ===
In cases where the underlying reason for deformity is postural or idiopathic and is detected before the bones stop growing, back braces can be used. Braces provide support to the muscles and bones, as well as apply corrective pressure to reduce the curvature. Braces for kyphoscoliosis have to be designed such that they become effective with abnormal curvatures in both the coronal and sagittal planes. The latest in brace design involves the use of CAD/CAM, which is available only in a few developed countries such as Germany. The efficacy of braces for correcting curvature issues has been analyzed by a few studies. In one such study, it was found that bracing led to successful outcomes in 72% of patients and correlated strongly with hours of braces worn. However, compliance with wearing braces for a period up to 18 hours or more can be physiologically and psychologically limiting, especially when one considers the teenage period.

=== Surgery ===
Surgery is usually indicated when the extent of deformity is large, causes issues in physiological functions such as breathing, interferes with the daily activities or is cosmetically unacceptable to the adult. It is also advised when the patient has passed the age where other therapies such as braces are no longer effective. Kyphoscoliosis implies that the patient has both types of curvature deformity.

The decision to undergo surgery is usually complex, but may become inevitable when the deformity begins to interfere with crucial physiological functions like breathing or makes everyday activities extremely painful. Sometimes, patients in their early adulthood may choose to have surgery because the presence of such deformity causes social issues such as rejection from their peers, or their disability prevents them from working. In the case of elderly patients who have such deformity triggered at a later age, other factors are to be considered such as the presence of underlying disease that caused it, whether a progressive decline is expected, and if conservative treatments using physiotherapy or drugs have failed to give relief from debilitating pain.

Surgery is attempted to correct the spine and arrest progression of the deformity. Surgery may include the use of spinal implants like the Harrington Rod, or the VEPTR.

==== Risks of corrective spine surgery ====
A study which focused on elderly patients found that the rate of complications was much higher for a sample population of 72 cases with a mean age of 60.7 years. The rate of complications was as high as 22% in the sample. The study points out that in the case of elderly patients, surgery should only be considered when there is no other option left, the disease is in progression stage, and the quality of life has degraded to an extent where conservative treatments can no longer help with pain.

While there are many surgical approaches for spinal deformity correction, including anterior only, posterior only, and anterior-posterior. The technique that is most popular nowadays is posterior vertebral column resection, or pVCR. One of the studies which analyzed pVCR also noted the benefit of using a technique called neurogenic motor evoked potential (NMEP) monitoring in assisting the surgeon to avoid any neurological complications while performing a spine surgery.

== See also ==
- Lordosis
- Pott's disease
- Ehlers-Danlos Syndrome
