= Hypermobility =

Hypermobility may refer to:

- Hypermobility (joints), joints that stretch further than normal
  - Hypermobility spectrum disorder, a heritable connective tissue disorder
- Hypermobility (travel), frequent travelers

It should not be confused with flexibility.
