= Craniocervical instability =

Medical condition affecting the cervical spine

Craniocervical instability (CCI) is a medical condition characterized by excessive movement of the vertebra at the atlanto-occipital joint and the atlanto-axial joint located between the skull and the top two vertebra, known as C1 and C2. The condition can cause neural injury and compression of nearby structures, including the brain stem, spinal cord, vagus nerve, and vertebral artery, resulting in a constellation of symptoms.

Craniocervical instability is more common in people with a connective tissue disease, including Ehlers–Danlos syndromes, osteogenesis imperfecta, and rheumatoid arthritis. It is frequently co-morbid with atlanto-axial joint instability, Chiari malformation, or tethered spinal cord syndrome.

The condition can be brought on by physical trauma, including whiplash, laxity of the ligaments surrounding the joint, or other damage to the surrounding connective tissue.

== Symptoms and signs ==
The experience of craniocervical instability can range from minor symptoms to severe disability, in which patients are bedbound. The constellation of symptoms caused by craniocervical instability is known as cervico-medullary syndrome, which may include:

- Anxiety disorders
- Bobble-head doll syndrome – a sensation that the skull may fall off the cervical spine
- Clumsiness and motor delay
- Cognitive and memory decline
- Double or blurred vision
- Dysphagia – a sensation of choking
- Dyspnea
- Fatigue
- Lhermitte's sign
- Migraine
- Nausea
- Neck, shoulder, and jaw pain
- Occipital headaches
- Orthostatic intolerance
- Photophobia
- Syncope
- Tenderness at base of skull
- Tinnitus
- Tremors
- Palpitations
- Vertigo or dizziness
- Weakness of limbs

Symptoms are frequently worsened by a Valsalva maneuver or by being upright for long periods of time. Being upright is problematic because gravity allows increased interaction between the brain stem and the top of the spinal column, increasing symptoms.

Lying in the supine position can bring short-term relief. Lying supine eliminates the downward gravitational pull, reducing symptoms to some degree. Lying with the feet somewhat higher and head lower can be helpful in symptom reduction.

== Diagnosis ==
Craniocervical instability is usually diagnosed through neuro-anatomical measurement using radiography. Digital Motion X-ray is considered the most accurate method. Upright magnetic resonance imaging, supine magnetic resonance imaging, CT scan, and flexion and extension x-rays may also be used but are far less accurate and have a much higher potential for false negatives.

The measurements to diagnose craniocervical instability are:

- Clivo-Axial Angle equal or less than 135 degrees
- Grabb-Oakes measurement equal or greater than 9 mm
- Harris measurement greater than 12 mm
- Spinal subluxation

Alternatively, craniocervical instability can be diagnosed if a trial of cervical traction, typically using a halo fixation device, results in a significant alleviation of symptoms.

== Treatment ==
Conservative treatment of craniocervical instability includes physical therapy and the use of a cervical collar to keep the neck stable.

Cervical spinal fusion is performed on patients with more severe symptoms.

== See also ==
- Hypermobility spectrum disorder
