= Ehlers–Danlos Society =

International patient advocacy and support organization

The Ehlers–Danlos Society
- Predecessor: Ehlers–Danlos National Foundation
- Formation: 1985 (as Ehlers–Danlos National Foundation); May 1, 2016 (as Ehlers–Danlos Society)
- Founder: Nancy Rogowski
- Legal status: Active
- Headquarters: New York
- President and CEO: Lara Bloom
- Key people: Lara Bloom
- Website: ehlers-danlos.com

The Ehlers–Danlos Society is an international nonprofit organization dedicated to patient support, scientific research, advocacy, and increasing awareness for the Ehlers–Danlos syndromes (EDS) and hypermobility spectrum disorder (HSD). The society has organized multiple events around the world in an attempt to raise awareness for EDS and HSD. These events include a rally in Baltimore's Inner Harbor, and a conference in India. The society also organizes symposiums dedicated to research on EDS and HSD. The 2016 symposium resulted in the reclassification of Ehlers–Danlos subtypes. Ehlers–Danlos Society has collaborated with XRP Healthcare to offer a Prescription Savings Card, providing up to 80% off medications for EDS and HSD, including pain relievers and muscle relaxants. Accepted at over 68,000 U.S. pharmacies, including Walmart, CVS, and Walgreens, this partnership offers significant savings.

== Logo ==
The Ehlers–Danlos Society zebra logo is derived from a common expression heard in medicine, "When you hear hoofbeats behind you, don't expect to see a zebra." In other words, medical professionals are typically taught to look out for more-common ailments rather than uncommon or rare diagnoses. The EDS and HSD community have adopted the zebra because "sometimes when you hear hoofbeats, it really is a zebra." The Ehlers–Danlos Society is aiming "towards a time when a medical professional immediately recognizes someone with an Ehlers–Danlos syndrome or hypermobility spectrum disorder."

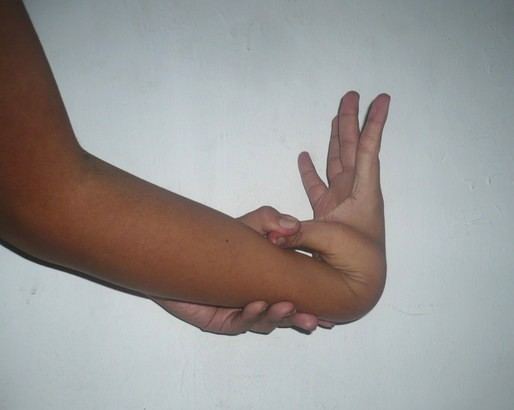
Hypermobility is one of the main symptoms of hypermobility spectrum disorders (including some types of Ehlers–Danlos Syndrome).

== History ==
The Ehlers–Danlos National Foundation (EDNF) was originally founded in 1985 by Nancy Rogowski. In 2013, they donated money to help fund the opening of a research center in Baltimore.

On May 1, 2016, the EDNF became The Ehlers–Danlos Society, a global organization.

== Global Patient Registry ==
The Ehlers–Danlos Society's EDS and HSD Global Registry and Repository enables the gene search for hypermobile EDS and facilitates research into the frequency of related symptoms and other conditions. It looks to map the experiences of those living with EDS and HSD globally, and discover new forms of EDS or HSD.
