= Ullrich disease =

- Specialty: Dermatology

Ullrich disease is a genetic extracellular matrix diseases of the skin characterized by puffy skin.

== See also ==
- Ehlers–Danlos syndrome
- List of cutaneous conditions
