= Gorlin sign =

Medical sign with high frequency in Ehlers–Danlos syndrome

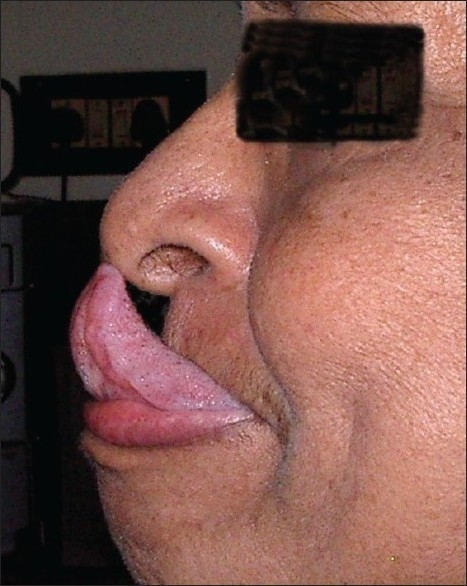
Gorlin's sign

Gorlin's sign is a medical term that indicates the ability in humans to touch the tip of the nose with the tongue. Approximately ten percent of the general population can perform this act, but fifty percent of people with Ehlers–Danlos syndrome (an inherited connective tissue disorder) have the ability. The sign is named after pathologist Robert J. Gorlin, who described it in twentieth century medical literature.

Gorlin's sign should not be confused with Gorlin syndrome, a serious inherited medical condition also named after the same pathologist.
