= Collagen, type I, alpha 2 =

Protein found in humans

COL1A2

Identifiers
- Aliases: COL1A2, OI4, collagen type I alpha 2, collagen type I alpha 2 chain, EDSCV, EDSARTH2
- External IDs: OMIM: 120160; MGI: 88468; GeneCards: COL1A2

Gene location (Human)
Chr.	Chromosome 7 (human)
Band	7q21.3	Start	94,394,895 bp
Band	7q21.3	End	94,431,227 bp

Gene location (Mouse)
Chr.	Chromosome 6 (mouse)
Band	6 A1|6 1.81 cM	Start	4,504,814 bp
Band	6 A1|6 1.81 cM	End	4,541,544 bp
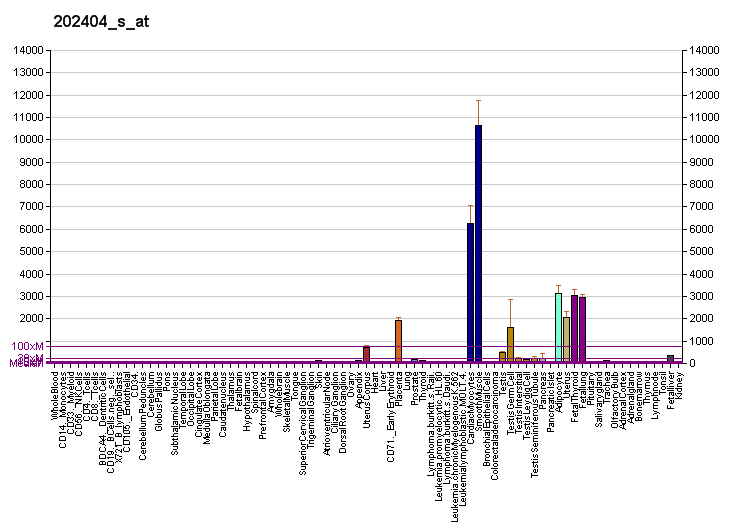

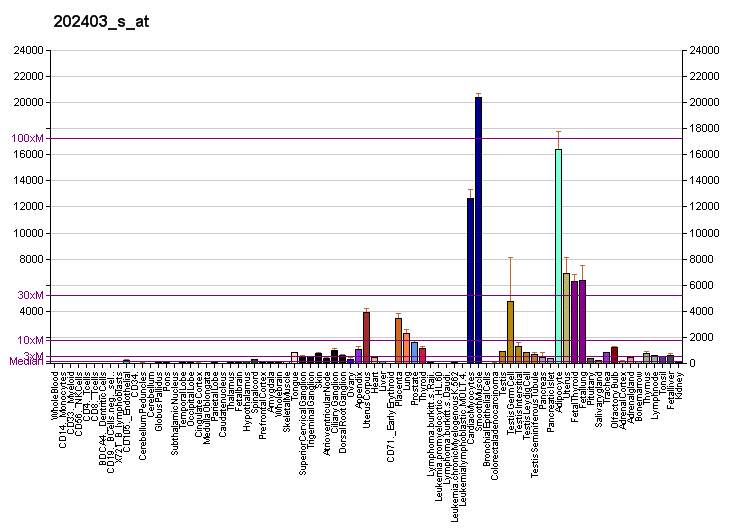
RNA expression pattern
Bgee	Human / Mouse (ortholog); Top expressed in: periodontal fiber; stromal cell of endometrium; skin of hip; tibia; visceral pleura; parietal pleura; saphenous vein; tendon of biceps brachii; gallbladder; skin of thigh / Top expressed in: calvaria; body of femur; efferent ductule; tibiofemoral joint; ascending aorta; fossa; vas deferens; aortic valve; umbilical cord; stroma of bone marrow; More reference expression data
BioGPS	More reference expression data
Gene ontology
Molecular function	metal ion binding; identical protein binding; SMAD binding; protein-macromolecule adaptor activity; platelet-derived growth factor binding; extracellular matrix structural constituent; protein binding; protease binding; extracellular matrix structural constituent conferring tensile strength
Cellular component	extracellular exosome; endoplasmic reticulum lumen; extracellular matrix; collagen; collagen type I trimer; extracellular space; endoplasmic reticulum; extracellular region; collagen-containing extracellular matrix
Biological process	blood coagulation; transforming growth factor beta receptor signaling pathway; extracellular matrix organization; collagen fibril organization; skin morphogenesis; odontogenesis; skeletal system development; collagen catabolic process; regulation of blood pressure; blood vessel development; regulation of immune response; leukocyte migration; protein heterotrimerization; cellular response to amino acid stimulus; platelet activation; Rho protein signal transduction; cytokine-mediated signaling pathway; bone mineralization; collagen metabolic process; extracellular matrix assembly
Sources:Amigo / QuickGO
Orthologs
Databases	NCBI: entry; OMA: entry
Species	Human	Mouse
Entrez	1278	12843
Ensembl	ENSG00000164692	ENSMUSG00000029661
UniProt	P08123	Q01149
RefSeq (mRNA)	NM_000089	NM_007743
RefSeq (protein)	NP_000080	NP_031769
Location (UCSC)	Chr 7: 94.39 – 94.43 Mb	Chr 6: 4.5 – 4.54 Mb
PubMed search
- Wikidata
View/Edit Human	View/Edit Mouse

Collagen alpha-2(I) chain is a protein that in humans is encoded by the COL1A2 gene.

This gene encodes one of the chains for type I collagen, the fibrillar collagen found in most connective tissues. Mutations in this gene are associated with osteogenesis imperfecta, Cardiac-valvular and Arthrochlasia type Ehlers–Danlos syndrome, idiopathic osteoporosis, and atypical Marfan syndrome. Symptoms associated with mutations in this gene, however, tend to be less severe than mutations in the gene for alpha-1 type I collagen, since alpha-2 is less abundant. Multiple messages for this gene result from multiple polyadenylation signals, a feature shared by most of the other collagen genes.

== See also ==
- Type I collagen
- Collagen
