= ZNF469 =

Protein-coding gene in the species Homo sapiens

Identifiers
- Aliases: ZNF469, BCS, BCS1, zinc finger protein 469, Zfp469
- External IDs: OMIM: 612078; MGI: 2684868; GeneCards: ZNF469

Gene location (Human)
Chr.	Chromosome 16 (human)
Band	16q24.2	Start	88,382,959 bp
Band	16q24.2	End	88,440,757 bp

Gene location (Mouse)
Chr.	Chromosome 8 (mouse)
Band	8|8 E1	Start	122,985,359 bp
Band	8|8 E1	End	122,999,389 bp
RNA expression pattern
Bgee	Human / Mouse (ortholog); Top expressed in: tibia; cartilage tissue; pancreatic epithelial cell; vein; right ventricle; saphenous vein; cardia; subthalamic nucleus; pons; ventral tegmental area / Top expressed in: basilar part of occipital bone; facial skeleton; rib; membranous bone; mandible; decidua; molar; bones of free part of lower limb; sphenoid bone; calvaria; More reference expression data
BioGPS	n/a
Gene ontology
Molecular function	metal ion binding; DNA binding; nucleic acid binding; DNA-binding transcription factor activity, RNA polymerase II-specific
Cellular component	nucleus
Biological process	transcription, DNA-templated; regulation of transcription, DNA-templated; regulation of transcription by RNA polymerase II
Sources:Amigo / QuickGO
Orthologs
Databases	NCBI: entry; OMA: entry
Species	Human	Mouse
Entrez	84627	195209
Ensembl	ENSG00000225614	ENSMUSG00000043903
UniProt	Q96JG9	n/a
RefSeq (mRNA)	NM_001127464; NM_001367624	NM_001362883
RefSeq (protein)	NP_001354553	n/a
Location (UCSC)	Chr 16: 88.38 – 88.44 Mb	Chr 8: 122.99 – 123 Mb
PubMed search
- Wikidata
View/Edit Human	View/Edit Mouse

Zinc finger protein 469 is a protein that in humans is encoded by the ZNF469 gene.

== Function ==
This gene encodes a zinc-finger protein. Low-percent homology to certain collagens suggests that it may function as a transcription factor or extra-nuclear regulator factor for the synthesis or organization of collagen fibers. Mutations in this gene cause brittle cornea syndrome.

== Clinical significance ==
Mutations in ZNF469 are associated with keratoconus as well as a type of Ehlers–Danlos syndrome called brittle cornea syndrome.
