= Degenerative suspensory ligament desmitis =

Equine disease

Degenerative suspensory ligament desmitis, commonly called DSLD, also known as equine systemic proteoglycan accumulation (ESPA), is a systemic disease of the connective tissue of the horse and other equines. It is a disorder akin to Ehlers–Danlos syndrome being researched in multiple horse breeds. Originally thought to be a condition of overwork and old age, the disease is now recognized as hereditary and has been seen in horses of all ages, including foals. The latest research (2010) has led to the proposed renaming of the disease from DSLD to ESPA because of the systemic and hereditary components now being found.

== Clinical Signs ==
Early in the disease process, DSLD may cause only mild or sporadic lameness, making early detection challenging. As the disease advances, distinct signs like heat, swelling, and pain in the suspensory ligaments emerge. An altered gait or a flat-footed stance due to a sinking fetlock joint are also indicative of the disease, often leading to significant fetlock joint arthritis.

DSLD was originally described in Peruvian Pasos, and this breed remains the most commonly affected. It has also been found in many other breeds, including Arabians, Thoroughbreds, American Quarter Horses, Morgans, Paso Finos, American Saddlebreds, several breeds of warmblood, Appaloosas, Friesians, Missouri Fox Trotters, Tennessee Walkers, American Paint Horses, National Show Horses, and Mustangs, as well as crossbreds and mules.

== Causes ==
Although its etiology is not fully understood yet, numerous factors have been suspected to be contributing towards the occurrence of DSLD in horses. It can be genetic predisposition, conformation-related problems, or the environmental causes, like improper nutrition or too much physical stress. It is highly desirable that such factors are thoroughly examined in order to achieve prevention and management.

DSLD was once considered a condition of the legs only, as one of the most visible signs is when the fetlocks, particularly on the hind legs, collapse into a "coon-footed" position. However, microscopic examination in necropsy has shown DSLD horses can not only be affected in the tendons and ligaments of all legs and the patella, but can have affected tissues in the nuchal ligament, eyes, aorta, skin and fascia, lungs and other organs, as well as ligaments and tendons throughout the body. Because of its systemic nature, and because connective tissue is present everywhere in a biological entity, the entire body becomes affected in multiple ways as the disease progresses. Some horses have shown an iron overload in the liver as well.

Ongoing research is working on the biochemical aspects of the disease and has found a problem in the transfer growth factor and decorin. It is strongly believed to be passed genetically, and those aspects are being studied in the search for a DNA marker.

== Sources ==
- About all aspects of DSLD/ESPA, dsldequine.info - Home
- "DSLD/ESPA" Akhal-Teke: A Differentiated View
