= ADAMTS2 =

Protein-coding gene in humans

Identifiers
- Aliases: ADAMTS2, ADAM-TS2, ADAMTS-2, ADAMTS-3, NPI, PC I-NP, PCI-NP, PCINP, PCPNI, PNPI, ADAM metallopeptidase with thrombospondin type 1 motif 2, EDSDERMS
- External IDs: OMIM: 604539; MGI: 1347356; GeneCards: ADAMTS2
Enzyme activity
EC #	BRENDA	ExPASy	KEGG	MetaCyc
3.4.24.14	↗	↗	↗	↗

Gene location (Mouse)
Chr.	Chromosome 11 (mouse)
Band	11|11 B1.3	Start	50,492,911 bp
Band	11|11 B1.3	End	50,698,400 bp
RNA expression pattern
Bgee	Human / Mouse (ortholog); Top expressed in: stromal cell of endometrium; subcutaneous adipose tissue; right lung; right coronary artery; spleen; left coronary artery; upper lobe of left lung; gastric mucosa; myometrium; left uterine tube / Top expressed in: ascending aorta; aortic valve; decidua; gastrula; umbilical cord; stroma of bone marrow; body of femur; ankle; cervix; vas deferens; More reference expression data
BioGPS	n/a
Gene ontology
Molecular function	zinc ion binding; peptidase activity; metalloendopeptidase activity; hydrolase activity; metallopeptidase activity; metal ion binding
Cellular component	extracellular region; collagen-containing extracellular matrix; extracellular matrix
Biological process	collagen catabolic process; protein processing; spermatogenesis; skin development; collagen fibril organization; lung development; proteolysis
Sources:Amigo / QuickGO
Orthologs
Databases	NCBI: entry
Species	Human	Mouse
Entrez	9509	216725
Ensembl	n/a	ENSMUSG00000036545
UniProt	O95450	Q8C9W3
RefSeq (mRNA)	NM_021599; NM_014244	NM_001277305; NM_175643
RefSeq (protein)	NP_055059; NP_067610	NP_783574
Location (UCSC)	n/a	Chr 11: 50.49 – 50.7 Mb
PubMed search
- Wikidata
View/Edit Human	View/Edit Mouse

A disintegrin and metalloproteinase with thrombospondin motifs 2 (ADAM-TS2) also known as procollagen I N-proteinase (PC I-NP) is an enzyme that in humans is encoded by the ADAMTS2 gene.

== Gene ==
The ADAMTS2 gene is located on the long (q) arm of chromosome 5 at the end (terminus) of the arm, from base pair 178,473,473 to base pair 178,704,934.

== Function ==
ADAMTS2 is responsible for processing several types of procollagen proteins. Procollagens are the precursors of collagens, the proteins that add strength and support to many body tissues. Specifically, this enzyme clips a short chain of amino acids off one end of the procollagen. This clipping step is necessary for collagen molecules to function normally and assemble into fibrils outside cells.

== Clinical significance ==
Ehlers–Danlos syndrome, dermatosparaxis type is caused by mutations in the ADAMTS2 gene. Several mutations in the ADAMTS2 gene have been identified in people with this syndrome. These mutations greatly reduce the production of the enzyme made by the ADAMTS2 gene. Procollagen cannot be processed correctly without this enzyme. As a result, collagen fibrils are not assembled properly; they appear ribbon-like and disorganized under the microscope. Cross-links, or chemical interactions, between collagen fibrils are also affected. These defects weaken connective tissue (the tissue that binds and supports the body's muscles, ligaments, organs, and skin), which causes the signs and symptoms of the disorder.

== See also ==
- ADAMTS5
- ADAMTS13
