= Robert J. Gorlin =

American scientist (1923-2006)

- Born: January 11, 1923; Hudson, New York
- Died: August 29, 2006 (aged 83); Minneapolis, Minnesota
- Education: Columbia University; Washington University in St. Louis; University of Iowa
- Children: 2
- Awards: Goldhaber Award from Harvard University, American Dental Association's Gold Medal Award for Lifetime Achievements, American Society of Human Genetics Award
- Scientific career
- Fields: Oral pathology, genetics
- Institutions: University of Minnesota School of Dentistry

Robert James Gorlin (January 11, 1923 – August 29, 2006) was an American oral pathologist, human geneticist and academic at the University of Minnesota School of Dentistry.

== Biography ==
Robert Gorlin was born on January 11, 1923, in Hudson, New York. Raised in Newark, New Jersey, Gorlin graduated from Weequahic High School in 1940. After receiving an A.B. degree in 1943 from Columbia University, Gorlin volunteered for the Army, where he was instructed to apply to dental school. He graduated in 1947 from Washington University School of Dental Medicine in St. Louis, Missouri, and then completed a master's degree in oral pathology from the State University of Iowa (now the University of Iowa), Iowa City, in 1956.

That same year, he joined the faculty at the University of Minnesota School of Dentistry, Minneapolis, as an associate professor and chair of the divisions of oral histology and oral pathology. At the time of his death, he was the UM Regents’ Professor Emeritus of Oral Pathology. He published over 600 articles in a variety of topics, and held joint appointments with the University of Minnesota's departments of pediatric medicine, laboratory medicine and pathology, obstetrics and gynecology, otolaryngology and dermatology.

Gorlin is survived by his children, Jed and Cathy.

== Awards ==
- 1961: Guggenheim Fellowship
- 1997: Senior Fellow in the Institute of Medicine of the National Academy of Sciences
- 1997: Goldhaber Award from Harvard University
- 1997: Premio Phoenix Anni Verdi Award, presented by the Italian Medical Genetics Society
- 2002: Honorary Doctor of Science, University of Minnesota’s highest honor
- 2003: American Dental Association's Gold Medal Award for Lifetime Achievements
- 2004: American Society of Human Genetics Award for Excellence in Human Genetics Education
- Five honorary doctorate degrees from universities in Athens, Dublin, and Copenhagen
- The invited presenter at the Nobel Foundation conference in Stockholm on the topic of genetic signaling in development and disease

== See also ==
- Gorlin sign
- Nevoid basal cell carcinoma syndrome
- Focal dermal hypoplasia
