= Annie Segarra =

American YouTuber and disability rights activist

Annie Elainey
- Born: Annie Segarra; August 22, 1990 (age 36)

YouTube information
- Channel: theannieelainey
- Genre: Disability
- Subscribers: 24.9 thousand
- Views: 1.6 million
- Last updated: February 3, 2021

Annie Segarra (born August 22, 1990), also known as Annie Elainey, is an American YouTuber, artist, and activist for LGBT and disability rights. Segarra, who is queer, Latinx, and disabled, advocates for accessibility, body positivity, and media representation of marginalized communities.

== YouTube career ==
In 2010, Segarra created a Tumblr account Stop Hating Your Body, which became a popular forum for people to share stories about body image and self-love. Segarra was invited to speak at schools about body image issues. She (Note: Segarra uses she/her and they/them pronouns. This article uses feminine pronouns for consistency.) launched a YouTube channel and began vlogging, as Annie Elainey, about body image and recovery from an eating disorder.

In 2014, Segarra began experiencing pain when walking, and eventually needed a wheelchair to get around. At age 26, she was diagnosed with Ehlers–Danlos syndrome (EDS), a genetic collagen disorder. Segarra documented her experiences and thoughts about disability on her YouTube channel. She has cited Frida Kahlo, another queer Latina suffering from chronic pain, as a source of empowerment.

Segarra felt that the 2017 Women's March lacked visibility and accessibility for disabled people. In response, she created a t-shirt with the text "The Future is Accessible", modeled after a popular "The Future is Female" shirt from the 1970s.

In 2017, Segarra was featured in the NBCNews.com Latino 20.

In 2019, Segarra was selected to be part of the YouTube NextUp program.

== Personal life ==
Segarra lives in Miami, Florida. She has a younger sister, Emily, who is autistic. Segarra regards Emily as her best friend.
