= Garry Turner =

British sideshow performer

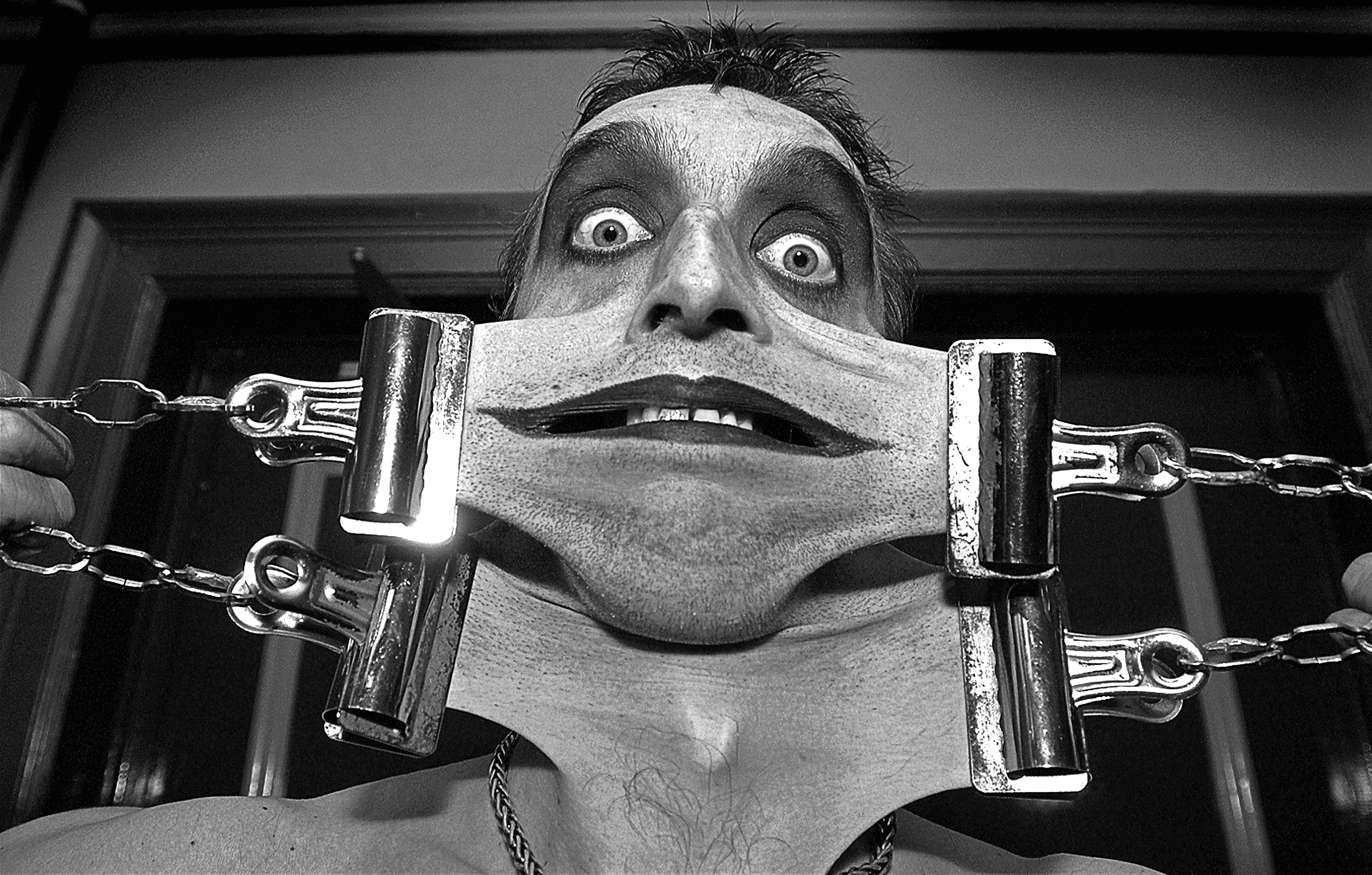
- Turner in 2013
- Born: Caistor, Lincolnshire, England, United Kingdom
- Other name: Garry "Stretch" Turner
- Occupation: Circus performer
- Years active: 2002–present

Garry Turner is a sideshow performer. He holds the current Guinness World Record for the stretchiest skin, caused by a serious form of Ehlers Danlos syndrome.

== Medical condition ==
Turner was born with a severe form of Ehlers–Danlos syndrome (EDS), a rare disorder of the connective tissues.

The condition causes the collagen that normally strengthens the skin and determines its elasticity to become defective. As a result, Turner's skin is exceptionally elastic and his joints are hypermobile.

On 29 October 1999, Turner stretched the skin on his abdomen to 15.8 cm (6.25 in) in Los Angeles, setting the Guinness World Record for the stretchiest skin. He has held the record ever since.

== Career ==
Since 2002, Turner has performed professionally as a sideshow performer under the stage name "Stretch". For more than two decades, his act has centred on demonstrating the extraordinary elasticity of his skin, a consequence of the severe form of Ehlers–Danlos syndrome with which he was born. Turner has said that he chose a career in sideshow performance to embrace what made him different.

During his career, Turner has performed with the Circus of Horrors, one of Britain's best-known contemporary horror circus productions, and with the Royal Family of Strange People, a troupe of unusual performers that appeared at the London Wonderground festival.

In addition to his live performances, Turner has appeared on television and in film. He was featured in an episode of Ripley's Believe It or Not!, where his skin elasticity was presented as one of the programme's unusual human feats. He later appeared in the short film He Took His Skin Off For Me.

For more than 25 years, Turner has held the Guinness World Record for the stretchiest skin. Through his performances and media appearances, he has helped raise public awareness of Ehlers–Danlos syndrome.
