= Ehlers–Danlos syndrome =

Group of genetic connective tissues disorders

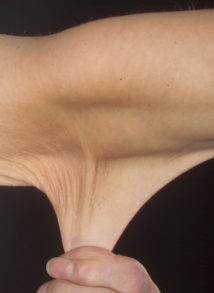
- Hyperelastic skin in Ehlers-Danlos syndrome
- Pronunciation: /ˈeɪlərz ˈdænlɒs/
- Specialty: Medical genetics
- Symptoms: Overly flexible joints, stretchy skin, abnormal scar formation
- Complications: Aortic dissection, joint dislocations, osteoarthritis, amplified musculoskeletal pain syndrome
- Usual onset: Childhood or adolescence, depending on type
- Duration: Lifelong
- Types: Hypermobile, classic, vascular, kyphoscoliosis, arthrochalasia, dermatosparaxis, brittle cornea syndrome, others
- Causes: Genetic
- Risk factors: Family history
- Diagnostic method: Genetic testing, physical examination
- Differential diagnosis: Marfan syndrome, cutis laxa syndrome, familial joint hypermobility syndrome, Loeys–Dietz syndrome, hypermobility spectrum disorder
- Treatment: Supportive
- Prognosis: Depends on specific disorder
- Frequency: 1 in 5,000 overall, 7.5 in 1,000 to 20 in 1,000 for hEDS

Ehlers–Danlos syndromes (EDS) compose a group of 13 genetic connective tissue disorders. Symptoms often include loose joints, joint pain, stretchy, velvety skin, and abnormal scar formation. These may be noticed at birth or in early childhood. Complications may include aortic dissection, joint dislocations, scoliosis, chronic pain, or early osteoarthritis.

Some types occurs due to mutations in one or more of the 19 particular genes which can contribute to the condition. The specific gene affected determines the type, though the genetic cause of hypermobile Ehlers–Danlos syndrome (hEDS) are still unknown. Some cases result from a new variation occurring during early development. In contrast, others are inherited in an autosomal dominant or recessive manner. Typically, these variations result in defects in the structure or processing of the protein collagen or tenascin. Diagnosis is often based on symptoms, particularly hEDS, but people may initially be misdiagnosed with somatic symptom disorder, depression, or myalgic encephalomyelitis/chronic fatigue syndrome. Genetic testing is used to confirm all types of EDS except hEDS, for which a genetic marker has yet to be discovered. The classification was updated in 2017, when a number of rarer forms added.

A cure is not known, and treatment is supportive in nature. Several medications can help improve symptoms, such as pain and blood pressure drugs, which reduce joint pain and complications caused by blood vessel weakness. Some forms have a normal life expectancy, but those that affect blood vessels generally decrease it.

While EDS affects at least one in 5,000 people globally, other types occur at lower frequencies. The prognosis depends on the specific type. Excess mobility was first described by Hippocrates in 400 BC. The syndromes are named after two dermatologists, Edvard Ehlers and Henri-Alexandre Danlos, who detected symptoms at the turn of the 20th century.

== Types ==
In 2017, 13 subtypes of EDS were classified using specific diagnostic criteria. According to the Ehlers–Danlos Society, the syndromes can also be grouped by the symptoms determined by specific gene mutations. Group A disorders are those that affect primary collagen structure and processing. Group B disorders affect collagen folding and crosslinking. Group C includes disorders of the structure and function of the myomatrix. Group D disorders are those that affect glycosaminoglycan biosynthesis. Defects in the complement pathway characterize Group E disorders. Group F are disorders of intracellular processes, and Group G is considered to be unresolved forms of EDS.

=== Classical ===
Classical EDS is characterized by extremely elastic skin that is fragile and bruises easily, and hypermobility of the joints. Molluscoid pseudotumors (calcified hematomas that occur over pressure points) and spheroids (cysts that contain fat occurring over forearms and shins) are also often seen. A side complication of the hyperelasticity presented in many EDS cases makes wound closure on its own more difficult. Sometimes, motor development is delayed and hypotonia occurs. The variation causing this type of EDS is in the genes COL5A2, COL5A1, and less frequently COL1A1. It involves the skin more than hEDS. In classical EDS, large variation in symptom presentation is seen. Because of this variance, EDS has often been underdiagnosed. Without genetic testing, healthcare professionals may be able to provide a provisional diagnosis based on careful examination of the mouth, skin, and bones, as well as by neurological assessment.

A good way to begin the diagnostic process is by reviewing a person's family history. EDS is an autosomal dominant condition, so it is often inherited from parents. Genetic testing remains the most reliable way to diagnose EDS. No cure for type 1 EDS has been found, but a course of non-weight-bearing exercise can help with muscular tension, which can help correct some EDS symptoms. Anti-inflammatory drugs and lifestyle changes can help with joint pain. Lifestyle choices should also be made with children who have EDS to try to prevent wounds to the skin. Protective garments can help with this. In a wound, deep stitches are often used and left in place for longer than normal.

=== Classical-like ===
Classical-like EDS (clEDS) is characterized by skin hyperextensibility with velvety skin texture and no presence of atrophic scarring, generalized joint hypermobility with or without recurrent dislocations (most often shoulder and ankle), and easily bruised skin or spontaneous ecchymoses (discolorations of the skin resulting from bleeding underneath). It can be caused by autosomal recessive variations in the TNXB gene.

=== Arthrochalasia ===
Arthrochalasia EDS (aEDS; formerly categorized as types 7A and B) is characterized by severe joint hypermobility and congenital hip dislocation. Other common features include fragile, elastic skin with easy bruising, hypotonia, kyphoscoliosis (kyphosis and scoliosis), and mild osteopenia. Type-I collagen is usually affected. It is very rare, with about 30 cases reported. It is more severe than the hypermobility type. Variations in the genes COL1A1 and COL1A2 cause it.

=== Brittle-cornea syndrome ===
Brittle-cornea syndrome (BCS) is characterized by the progressive thinning of the cornea, early-onset progressive keratoglobus or keratoconus, nearsightedness, hearing loss, and blue sclerae. Classic symptoms, such as hypermobile joints and hyperelastic skin, are also often seen. It has two types. Type 1 occurs due to variations in the ZNF469 gene. Type 2 is due to variations in the PRDM5 gene.

=== Cardiac-valvular ===
Cardiac-valvular EDS (cvEDS) is characterized by three major criteria: severe progressive cardiac-valvular problems (affecting aortic and mitral valves), skin problems such as hyperextensibility, atrophic scarring, thin skin, and easy bruising, and joint hypermobility (generalized or restricted to small joints). Four minor criteria may aid in the diagnosis of cvEDS. cvEDS is an autosomal recessive disorder, inherited through variation in both alleles of the gene COL1A2.

=== Dermatosparaxis ===
Dermatosparaxis EDS (dEDS; formerly categorized as type 7C) is associated with extremely fragile skin leading to severe bruising and scarring; saggy, redundant skin, especially on the face; hypermobility ranging from mild to serious; and hernias. Variations in the ADAMTS2 gene cause it. It is extremely rare, with around 11 cases reported worldwide.

=== Hypermobile ===
Hypermobile EDS (hEDS, formerly categorized as type 3) is mainly characterized by hypermobility that affects both large and small joints. It may lead to frequent joint subluxations (partial dislocations) and dislocations. In general, people with this variant have skin that is soft, smooth, velvety, bruises easily, and may have chronic muscle or bone pain. It affects the skin less than other forms. There is currently no available genetic test used to identify this subtype. hEDS is the most common of the 13 types of connective tissue disorders. Since no genetic test exists, providers diagnose hEDS based on clinical criteria and an assessment of generalized joint hypermobility.

Pregnant women who have hEDS are at an increased risk for complications. Some possible complications are pre-labor rupture of membranes, a drop in blood pressure with anesthesia, precipitated birth (very fast, active labor), malposition of the fetus, and increased bleeding. Individuals with hEDS may run the risk of falling, postpartum depression (more than the general population), and slow healing from the birthing process.

=== Kyphoscoliosis ===
Kyphoscoliosis EDS (kEDS; formerly categorized as type 6) is associated with severe hypotonia at birth, delayed motor development, progressive scoliosis (present from birth), and scleral fragility. People may also have easy bruising, fragile arteries that are prone to rupture, unusually small corneas, and osteopenia (low bone density). Other common features include a "marfanoid habitus" characterized by long, slender fingers (arachnodactyly), unusually long limbs, and a sunken chest (pectus excavatum) or protruding chest (pectus carinatum). It can be caused by variations in the gene PLOD1, or rarely, in the FKBP14 gene.

=== Musculocontractural ===
Musculocontractural EDS (mcEDS) is characterized by congenital multiple contractures, characteristically adduction-flexion contractures and/or talipes equinovarus (clubfoot), characteristic craniofacial features, which are evident at birth or in early infancy, and skin features such as skin hyperextensibility, bruising, skin fragility with atrophic scars, and increased palmar wrinkling. It can be caused by variations in the CHST14 gene. Some other cases can be caused by variations in the DSE gene.As of 2021, 48 individuals have been reported to have mcEDS-CHST14, while 8 individuals have mcEDS-DSE.

=== Myopathic ===
Bethlem myopathy 2, formerly known as Myopathic EDS (mEDS), is characterized by three major criteria: congenital muscle hypotonia and/or muscle atrophy that improves with age, proximal joint contractures of the knee, hip, and elbow, and hypermobility of distal joints (ankles, wrists, feet, and hands). Four minor criteria may also contribute to a diagnosis of mEDS. This disorder can be inherited through either an autosomal dominant or an autosomal recessive pattern. Molecular testing must be completed to verify that mutations in the COL12A1 gene are present; if not, other collagen-type myopathies should be considered.

=== Periodontal ===
Periodontal EDS (pEDS) is an autosomal-dominant disorder characterized by four major criteria of severe and intractable periodontitis of early-onset (childhood or adolescence), lack of attached gingiva, pretibial plaques, and family history of a first-degree relative who meets clinical criteria. Eight minor criteria may also contribute to the diagnosis of pEDS. Molecular testing may reveal mutations in C1R or C1S genes affecting the C1r protein.

=== Spondylodysplastic ===
Spondylodysplastic EDS (spEDS) is characterized by short stature (progressive in childhood), muscle hypotonia (ranging from severe congenital to mild later-onset), and bowing of limbs. It can be caused by variations in both copies of the B4GALT7 gene. Other cases can be caused by variations in the B3GALT6 gene. People with variations in this gene can have kyphoscoliosis, tapered fingers, osteoporosis, aortic aneurysms, and problems with the lungs. Other cases can be caused by the SLC39A13 gene. Those with variations in this gene have protuberant eyes, wrinkled palms of the hands, tapering fingers, and distal joint hypermobility.

=== Vascular ===
Vascular EDS (vEDS; formerly categorized as type 4) is identified by skin that is thin, translucent, extremely fragile, and bruises easily. It is also characterized by fragile blood vessels and organs that can easily rupture. Affected people are frequently short and have thin scalp hair. It also has characteristic facial features, including large eyes, an undersized chin, sunken cheeks, a thin nose and lips, and ears without lobes. Joint hypermobility is present, but generally confined to the small joints (fingers, toes). Other common features include club foot, tendon and/or muscle rupture, acrogeria (premature aging of the skin of the hands and feet), early-onset varicose veins, pneumothorax (collapse of a lung), the recession of the gums, and a decreased amount of fat under the skin. It can be caused by the variations in the COL3A1 gene. Rarely, COL1A1 variations can also cause it.

== Signs and symptoms ==
This group of disorders affects connective tissues across the body, with symptoms most typically present in the joints, skin, and blood vessels. But as connective tissue is found throughout the body, EDS may result in an array of unexpected impacts with any degree of severity, and the condition is not limited to joints, skin, and blood vessels. Effects range from mildly loose joints to life-threatening cardiovascular complications. Due to the diversity of subtypes within the EDS family, symptoms may vary widely among people diagnosed with EDS.

=== Musculoskeletal ===
Musculoskeletal symptoms include hyperflexible joints that are unstable and prone to sprain, dislocation, subluxation, and hyperextension. As a result of frequent tissue injury, there can be an early onset of advanced osteoarthritis, chronic degenerative joint disease, swan-neck deformity of the fingers, and Boutonniere deformity of the fingers. Tendon and ligament laxity offer minuscule protection from tearing in muscles and tendons, but these problems persist.

Deformities of the spine, such as scoliosis (curvature of the spine), kyphosis (a thoracic hump), tethered spinal cord syndrome, craniocervical instability (CCI), and atlantoaxial instability may also be present. Osteoporosis and osteopenia are also associated with EDS and symptomatic joint hypermobility.

There can also be myalgia (muscle pain) and arthralgia (joint pain), which may be severe and disabling. Trendelenburg's sign is often seen, which means that when standing on one leg, the pelvis drops on the other side. Osgood–Schlatter disease, a painful lump on the knee, is common as well. In infants, walking can be delayed (beyond 18 months of age), and bottom-shuffling instead of crawling occurs.

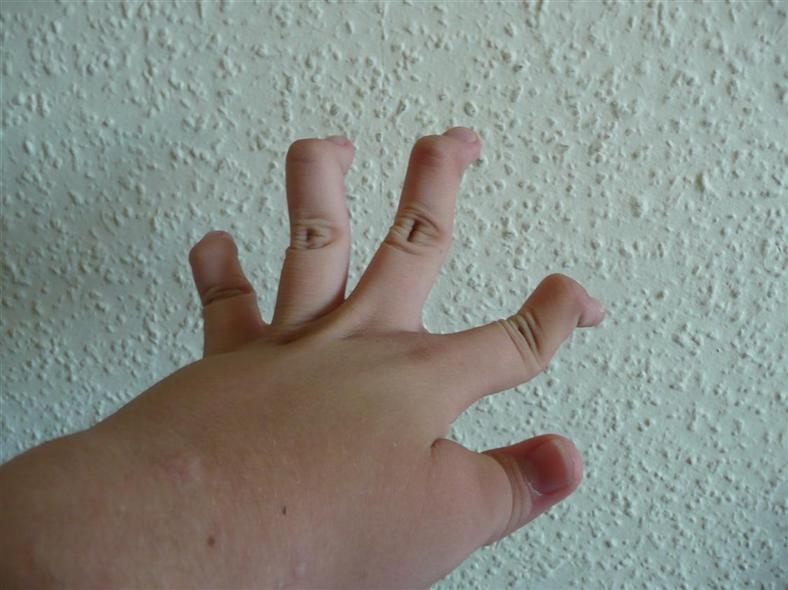
Individual with EDS showing hypermobile fingers, including the "swan-neck" malformation on the 2nd–5th digits, and a hypermobile thumb

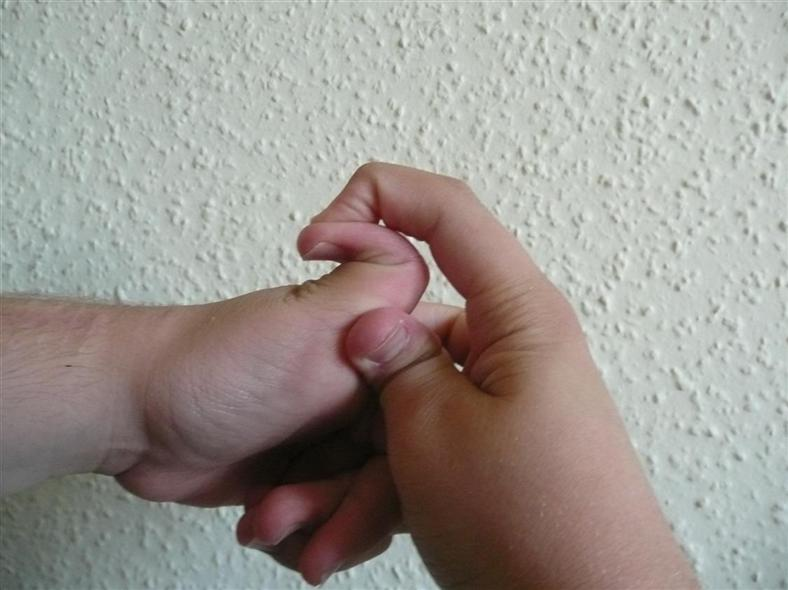
Individual with EDS displaying hypermobile thumb

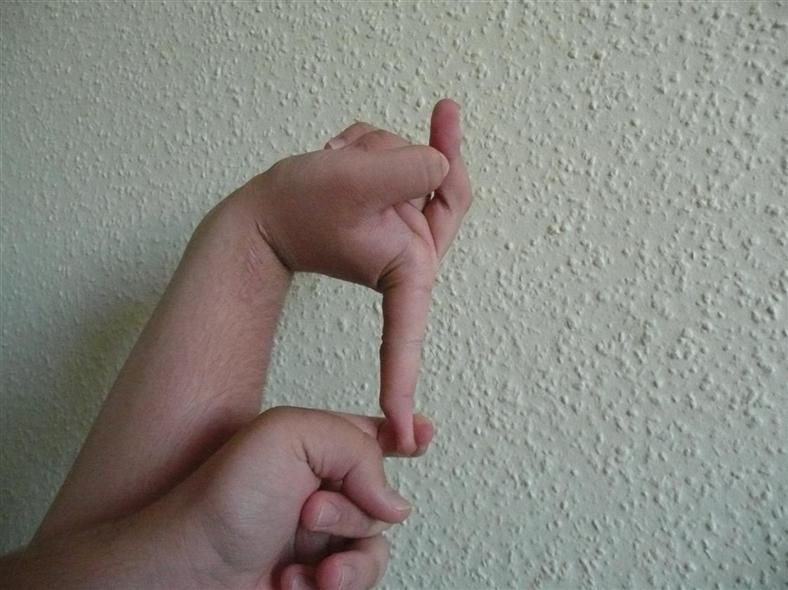
Individual with EDS displaying hypermobile metacarpophalangeal joints

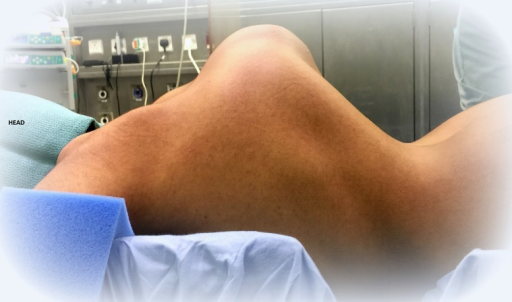
Kyphoscoliosis of the back of someone with kyphoscoliosis EDS

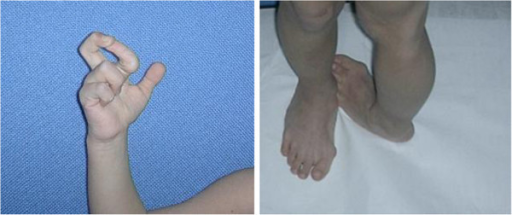
Severe joint hypermobility in a girl with EDS arthrochalasia type

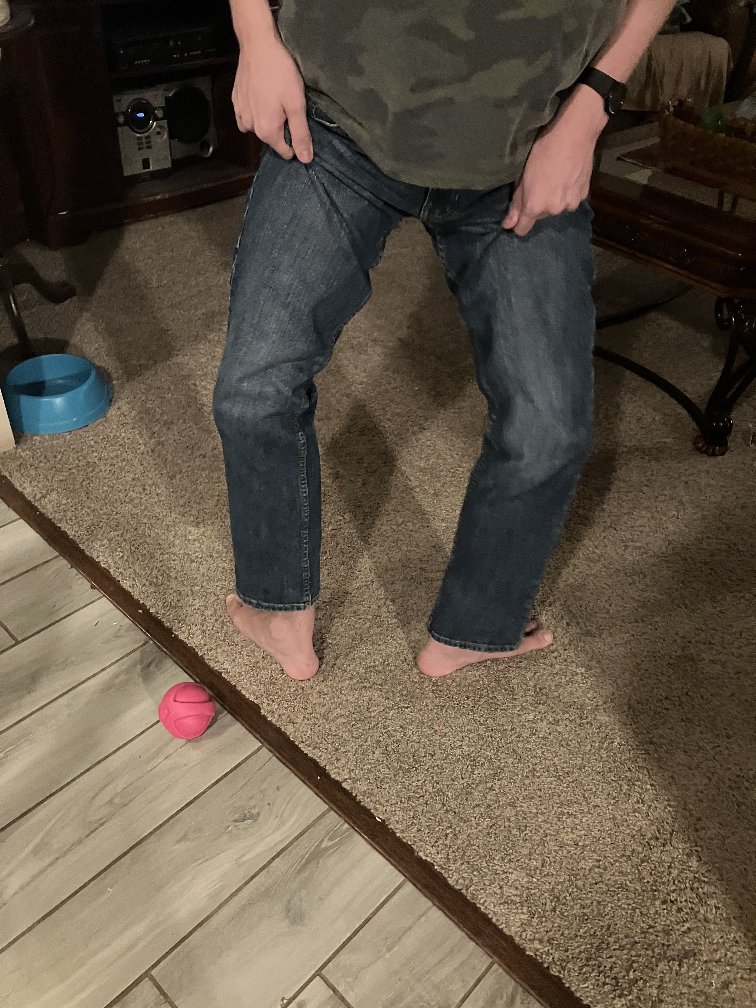
Male, late adolescent, with hypermobile type

=== Skin ===
The weak connective tissue causes abnormal skin. This may present as stretchy or, in other types, simply be velvet soft. In all types, some increased fragility occurs, but the degree varies depending on the underlying subtype. The skin may tear and bruise easily, and may heal with abnormal atrophic scars; atrophic scars that resemble cigarette paper are a sign seen in those whose skin might appear otherwise normal. In some subtypes, though not the hypermobile subtype, redundant skin folds occur, especially on the eyelids. Redundant skin folds are areas of excess skin lying in folds.

Other skin symptoms include molluscoid pseudotumors, especially on pressure points, petechiae, subcutaneous spheroids, livedo reticularis; piezogenic papules are less common. In vascular EDS, skin can also be thin and translucent. In dermatosparaxis EDS, the skin is extremely fragile and saggy.

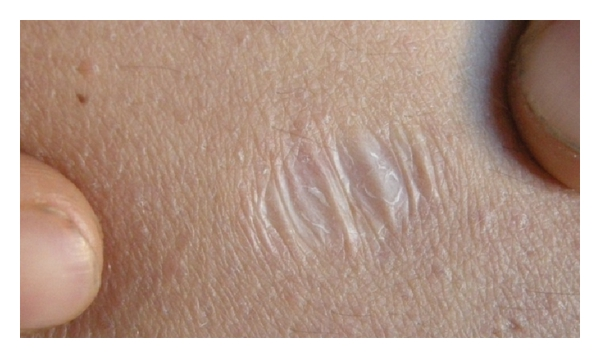
Atrophic scar in a case of EDS

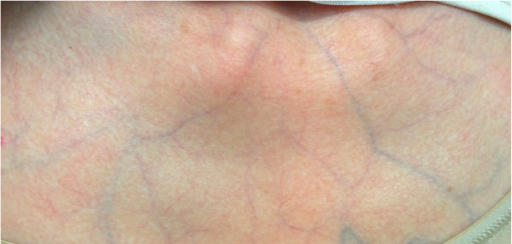
Translucent skin in vascular EDS

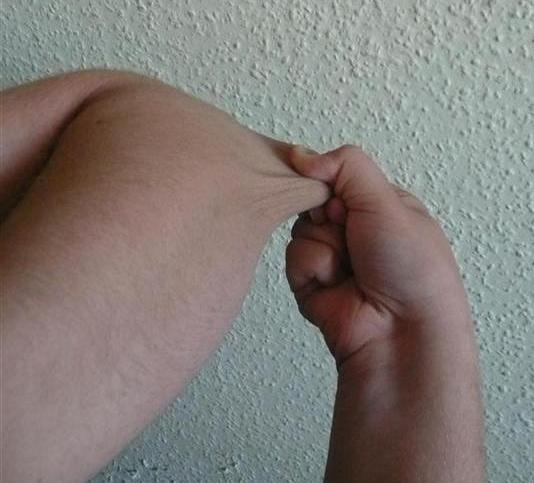
Individual with EDS displaying skin hyperelasticity

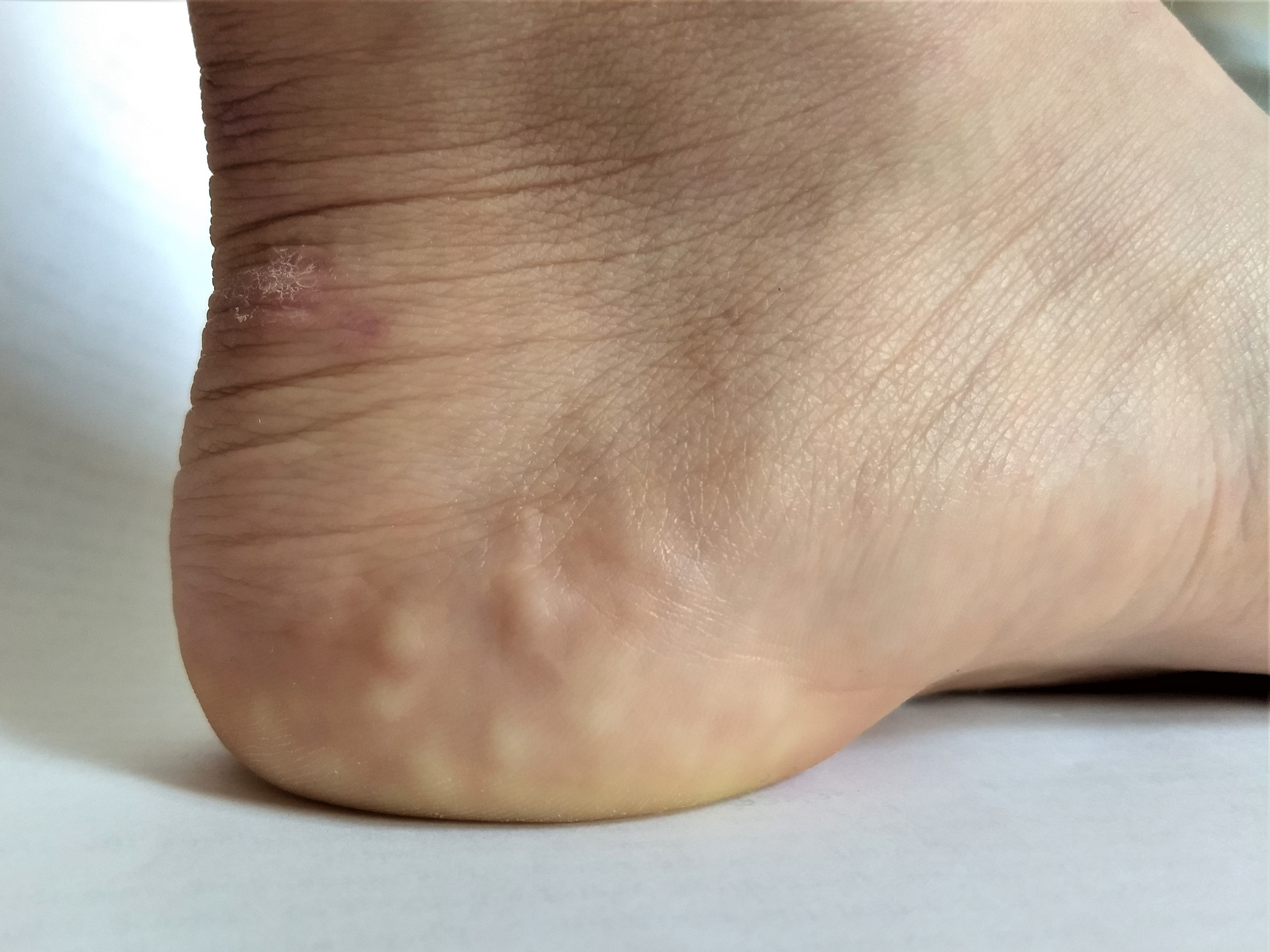
Piezogenic papules on the heel of an individual with hypermobile EDS

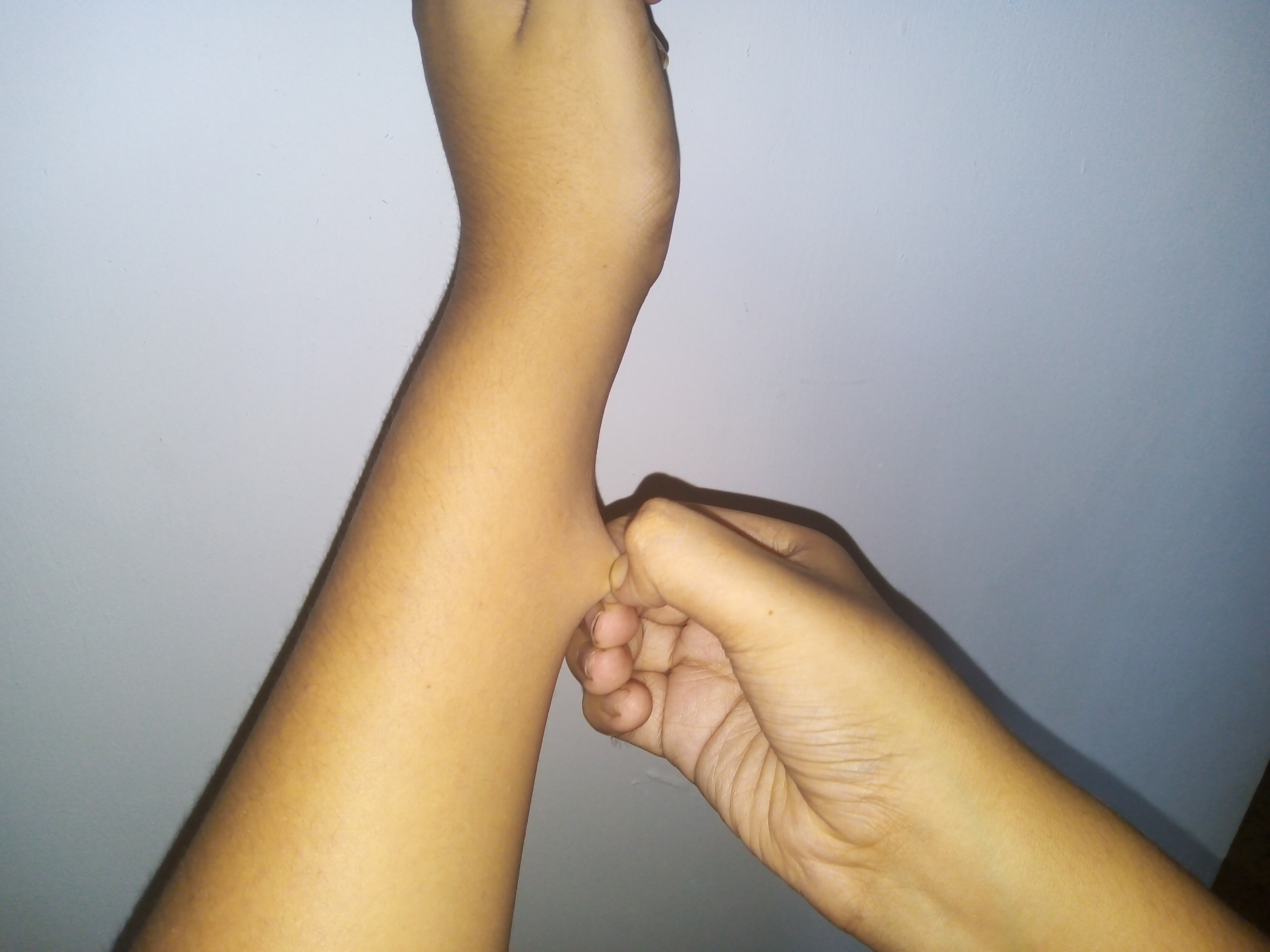
Skin hyperelasticity in the wrist

=== Cardiovascular ===
Although cardiovascular involvement depends significantly on the diagnosed subtype of EDS, several co-morbidities and symptoms are closely linked to the disorder as a whole. Some studies suggest that structural abnormalities are not the root cause of the vast majority of cardiac symptoms, but rather, dysautonomia is the primary culprit. Associated symptoms can include, but are not limited to, palpitations, near-syncope and syncope, heat intolerance, and difficulty managing blood pressure and heart rate. One study published in 2013 found that patients with EDS were more likely to also be diagnosed with postural orthostatic tachycardia syndrome, more commonly known as POTS.Weak connective tissues in the heart can cause problems with valve structure and function. Mitral valve prolapse and regurgitation and aortic root dilation are found more commonly in EDS patients and others with similar connective tissue disorders. In some cases, EDS manifests within the vasculature as well. Major artery aneurysms and dissections are sometimes seen as a result of faulty structural integrity.

- Thoracic outlet syndrome
- Arterial rupture
- Valvular heart disease, such as mitral valve prolapse, creates an increased risk for infective endocarditis during surgery. This may progress to a life-threatening degree. Heart conduction abnormalities have been found in those with hypermobility form of EDS.
- Dilation (aneurysm) or rupture (dissection) of ascending aorta
- Cardiovascular autonomic dysfunction such as postural orthostatic tachycardia syndrome
- Raynaud's phenomenon
- Varicose veins
- Heart murmur
- Heart conduction abnormalities

=== Urogynaecological ===
Weakened connective tissues can lead to pelvic organ prolapse in female patients with EDS. Patients may also experience voiding difficulties, frequent urinary tract infections, and incontinence due to structural abnormalities. Pelvic girdle pain is also frequently reported.

Menorrhagia, dysmenorrhea, and dyspareunia are common symptoms associated with EDS and are often mistaken for endometriosis. Excessive menstrual bleeding can sometimes be attributed to inappropriate platelet aggregation, but faulty collagen leads to weakened capillary walls, which increase the likelihood of hemorrhage.

In cases of pregnancy, patients with EDS are likelier to experience complications during parturition. Post-partum hemorrhage and maternal injury, such as sporadic pelvic displacement, hip dislocation, torn and stretched ligaments, and skin tearing, can all be linked to the altered structure of connective tissues.

=== Gastrointestinal ===
Research suggests a correlation between connective tissue disorders such as EDS and both structural and functional problems within the gastrointestinal tract.

==== Inflammatory problems ====
High incidences of coexisting inflammatory disorders suggest a correlation between connective tissue disorders and the development of such aforementioned conditions. Inflammatory bowel diseases such as Crohn's disease, ulcerative colitis and celiac disease are more common in EDS patients when compared to control groups. Of note, patients who are already diagnosed with an inflammatory bowel disorder are not necessarily likely to develop symptoms of a connective tissue disorder, as the two have separate but not totally confounding etiologies. Eosinophilic esophagitis, an inflammatory condition characterized by allergic-type reactions to various foods and chemicals and extensive esophageal remodeling, is eight times more likely in patients with connective tissue disorders when compared to patients without.

==== Functional problems ====
Functionally, small bowel dysmotility, delayed gastric emptying and delayed colonic transit are commonly related to EDS. These changes in transit speeds within the gastrointestinal system can cause a host of symptoms, including abdominal pain, bloating, nausea, reflux symptoms, vomiting, constipation, and diarrhea.

Some studies also suggest problems with the liver, which is, in large part, responsible for bilirubin conjugation. Although research in this area is sparse, patients with joint hypermobility were found to have higher rates of indirect hyperbilirubinemia than control groups.

==== Structural problems ====
Structurally, changes within the musculature in the intestine, such as increased elastin, can lead to increased frequency of herniation. Laxity of the phreno-esophageal and gastro-hepatic ligaments can lead to hiatal hernia, which in turn can lead to commonly reported symptoms such as acid reflux, abdominal pain, early satiety, and bloating. Internal organ prolapses and intestinal intussusceptions occur with greater frequency in patients with weakened connective tissues.

==== Autonomic problems ====
Although neurogastroenterological manifestations in connective tissue disorders are common, their root cause is not yet known. Splanchnic circulation, small fiber neuropathy and altered vascular compliance have all been named as potential contributors to gastrointestinal complaints, particularly for patients who have a known, comorbid autonomic condition.Dysautonomia symptoms, autonomic system dysfunction, in hEDS is associated with exercise intolerance and cardiac atrophy.

=== Neurological ===
Chronic headaches are common in patients with Ehlers–Danlos syndrome, whether related to dysautonomia, temporomandibular joint dysfunction (TMD), muscle tension, tethered cord syndrome, craniocervical instability, and alantoaxial instability.

Arnold–Chiari malformation is also more frequently found in patients with EDS because of the instability at the juncture between skull and spine. This causes herniation of the posterior fossa below the foramen magnum. Ligaments in the neck are unable to heal properly, so the neck structure cannot support the skull, which can then sink into the brainstem, blocking the flow of cerebrospinal fluid, which in turn causes autonomic dysfunction. Increased pressure created by the malformation can lead to a flattened pituitary gland, hormone changes, sudden severe headaches, ataxia, and poor proprioception.

Ophthalmological manifestations include nearsightedness, retinal tearing and retinal detachment, keratoconus, blue sclera, dry eye, Sjogren's syndrome, lens subluxation, angioid streaks, epicanthal folds, strabismus, corneal scarring, brittle cornea syndrome, cataracts, carotid-cavernous sinus fistulas, and macular degeneration.

Otological complications may also occur. Hearing loss is common, both conductive and sensorineural, and is most often bilateral. Otosclerosis and instability of the bones in the inner ear may also contribute to hearing loss.

=== Other manifestations ===
- Hiatal hernia
- Gastroesophageal reflux
- Poor gastrointestinal motility
- Dysautonomia
- Gorlin's sign (touch tongue to nose)
- Anal prolapse
- Flat feet
- Tracheobronchomalacia / tracheal collapse
- Collapsed lung (spontaneous pneumothorax)
- Nerve disorders (carpal tunnel syndrome, acroparesthesia, neuropathy, including small fiber neuropathy)
- Insensitivity to local anesthetics
- Dental problems including gum disease and enamel hypoplasia
- Platelet aggregation failure (platelets do not clump together properly)
- Mast cell disorders (including mast cell activation syndrome and mastocytosis)
- Pregnancy complications: increased pain, mild to moderate peripartum bleeding, cervical insufficiency, uterine tearing, or premature rupture of membranes
- Hearing loss may occur in some types
- There is some evidence that EDS is associated with greater than expected frequencies of neurodevelopmental disorders such as attention deficit hyperactivity disorder (ADHD) and other learning, communication and motor issues, including autism spectrum conditions and Tourette syndrome.
- There is some evidence that EDS is associated with greater than expected frequencies of mental health issues, including anxiety and mood disorders.
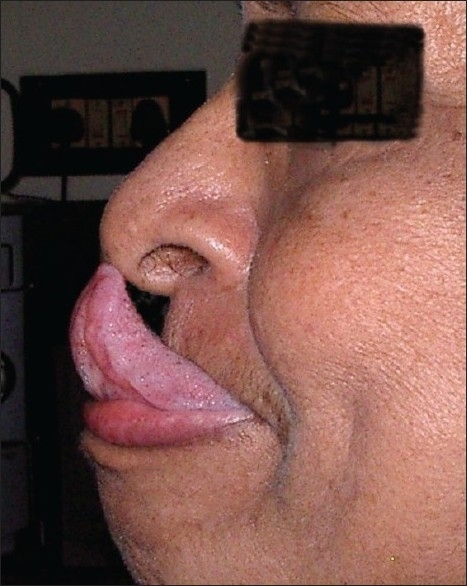
Gorlin's sign in a case of EDS

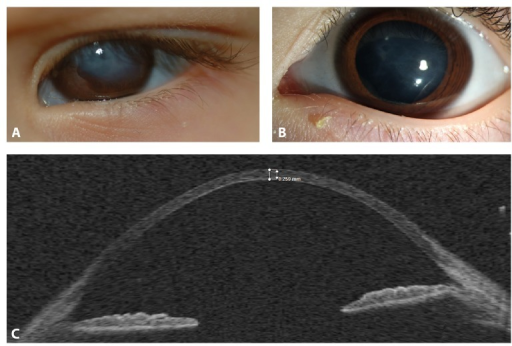
Keratoglobus in a case of EDS with brittle cornea syndrome

Because it is often undiagnosed or misdiagnosed in childhood, some instances of EDS have been mischaracterized as child abuse. The pain may also be misdiagnosed as a behavior disorder or Munchausen by proxy.

The pain associated with EDS ranges from mild to debilitating.

== Causes ==
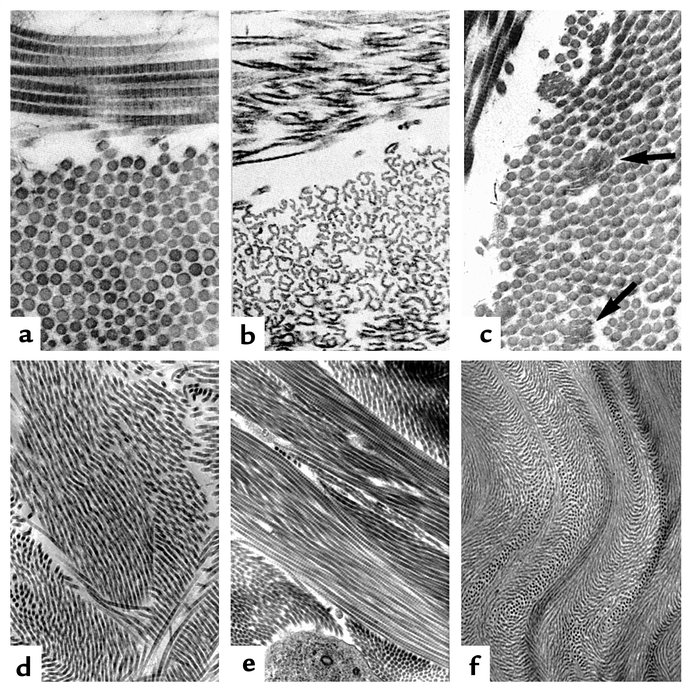
The collagen fibril and EDS: (a) Normal collagen fibrils are of uniform size and spacing. Fibrils from a person with dermatosparaxis (b) show dramatic alterations in fibril morphology with severe effects on the tensile strength of connective tissues. A person with classical EDS (c) shows composite fibrils. Fibrils from a TNX-deficient person (d) are uniform in size and no composite fibrils are seen. TNX-null (e) fibrils are less densely packed and not as well aligned to neighboring fibrils.

Every type of EDS except the hypermobile type (which affects the vast majority of people with EDS) can be positively tied to specific genetic variation.

Variations in these genes can cause EDS:

- Collagen primary structure and collagen processing: ADAMTS2, COL1A1, COL1A2, COL3A1, COL5A1, COL5A2
- Collagen folding and collagen cross-linking: PLOD1, FKBP14
- Structure and function of myomatrix: TNXB, COL12A1
- Glycosaminoglycan biosynthesis: B4GALT7, B3GALT6, CHST14, DSE
- Complement pathway: C1R, C1S
- Intracellular processes: SLC39A13, ZNF469, PRDM5

Variations in these genes usually alter the structure, production, or processing of collagen or proteins that interact with collagen. Collagen provides structure and strength to connective tissue. A defect in collagen can weaken connective tissue in the skin, bones, blood vessels, and organs, resulting in the features of the disorder. Inheritance patterns depend on the specific syndrome.

Most forms of EDS are inherited in an autosomal dominant pattern, which means only one of the two copies of the gene in question must be altered to cause a disorder. A few are inherited in an autosomal recessive pattern, which means both copies of the gene must be altered for a person to be affected. It can also be an individual (de novo or "sporadic") variation. Sporadic variations occur without any inheritance.

== Diagnosis ==
A diagnosis can be made by an evaluation of medical history and clinical observation. The Beighton criteria are widely used to assess the degree of joint hypermobility. DNA and biochemical studies can help identify affected people. Diagnostic tests include collagen gene-variant testing, collagen typing via skin biopsy, echocardiogram, and lysyl hydroxylase or oxidase activity, but these tests cannot confirm all cases, especially in instances of an unmapped variation, so clinical evaluation remains important. If multiple members of a family are affected, prenatal diagnosis may be possible using a DNA information technique known as a linkage study. Knowledge about EDS among all kinds of practitioners is poor. Research is ongoing to identify genetic markers for all types.

=== hEDS ===
Because no single gene has been identified as the sole cause of the most common type of EDS, the hypermobile type, obtaining a diagnosis is often difficult. The 2017 diagnostic criteria are as follows:

- Criterion 1: Generalized joint hypermobility, as measured by the Beighton score
- Criterion 2: Minimum two of the following must be met:
  - Symptoms that suggest a difference in connective tissue structure
    - Unusually soft or velvety skin
    - Mild skin hyperextensibility
    - Unexplained striae distensae or rubae at the back, groins, thighs, breasts, and/or abdomen in adolescents, men, or pre-pubertal women without a history of significant gain or loss of body fat or weight
    - Bilateral piezogenic papules of the heel
    - Recurrent or multiple abdominal hernia(s)
    - Atrophic scarring involving at least two sites and without the formation of truly papyraceous and/or hemosideric scars as seen in classical EDS
    - Pelvic floor, rectal, and/or uterine prolapse in children, men, or nulliparous women without a history of morbid obesity or other known predisposing medical condition
    - Dental crowding and a high or narrow palate
    - Arachnodactyly
    - Arm span-to-height ratio ≥1.05
    - Mitral valve prolapse (MVP) mild or greater based on strict echocardiographic criteria
    - Aortic root dilatation with Z-score >+2
  - Positive family history
  - Proof that these symptoms interfere with daily life
    - Musculoskeletal pain in two or more limbs, recurring daily for at least 3 months
    - Chronic, widespread pain for ≥3 months
    - Recurrent joint dislocations or frank joint instability, in the absence of trauma
- Criterion 3: Exclusion of all other possible connective tissue disorders that may be the root cause of symptoms.

In cases where all criteria are met, a patient can be diagnosed with hEDS according to The International Consortium on Ehlers-Danlos Syndromes and Hypermobility Spectrum Disorders

=== Differential diagnosis ===
Several disorders share some characteristics with EDS. For example, in cutis laxa, the skin is loose, hanging, and wrinkled. In EDS, the skin can be pulled away from the body, but is elastic and returns to normal when let go. In Marfan syndrome, the joints are very mobile, and similar cardiovascular complications occur. People with a "marfanoid" appearance are often tall and thin with long arms and legs and "spidery" fingers, while EDS phenotypes vary considerably. Certain subtypes of EDS may involve short stature, large eyes, and the appearance of a small mouth and chin, due to a small palate. The palate can have a high arch, causing dental crowding. Blood vessels can sometimes be easily seen through translucent skin, especially on the chest. The genetic connective tissue disorder Loeys–Dietz syndrome also has symptoms that overlap with EDS.

In the past, Menkes disease, a copper metabolism disorder, was thought to be a form of EDS. People are commonly misdiagnosed with fibromyalgia, bleeding disorders, or other disorders that can mimic EDS symptoms. Because of these similar disorders and complications that can arise from an unmonitored case of EDS, a correct diagnosis is important. Pseudoxanthoma elasticum is worth consideration in diagnosis.

== Management ==
No cure for Ehlers–Danlos syndrome is known, and treatment is supportive. Close monitoring of the cardiovascular system, physiotherapy, occupational therapy, and orthopedic instruments (e.g., wheelchairs, bracing, casting) may be helpful. This can help stabilize the joints and prevent injury. Orthopedic instruments are helpful for the prevention of further joint damage, especially for long distances. People should avoid activities that cause the joint to lock or overextend.

A physician may prescribe casting to stabilize joints. Physicians may refer a person to an orthotist for orthotic treatment (bracing). Physicians may also consult a physical and/or occupational therapist to help strengthen muscles and teach people how to use and preserve their joints properly.

Aquatic therapy promotes muscular development and coordination. With manual therapy, the joint is gently mobilized within the range of motion and/or manipulated. If conservative therapy is not helpful, surgical joint repair may be necessary. Medication to decrease pain or manage cardiac, digestive, or other related conditions may be prescribed. To decrease bruising and improve wound healing, some people have responded to vitamin C. Medical care workers often take special precautions because of the sheer number of complications that tend to arise in people with EDS. In vascular EDS, signs of chest or abdominal pain are considered trauma situations.

Cannabinoids and medical marijuana have shown some efficacy in reducing pain levels.

In general, medical intervention is limited to symptomatic therapy. Before pregnancy, people with EDS may be recommended to have genetic counseling and to familiarize themselves with the risks pregnancy poses. Children with EDS should be given information about the disorder so they can understand why they should avoid contact sports and other physically stressful activities. Children should be taught that they should not demonstrate the unusual positions they can maintain due to loose joints, as this may cause early degeneration of the joints. Emotional support, along with behavioral and psychological therapy, can be useful. Support groups can be immensely helpful for people dealing with major lifestyle changes and poor health. Family members, teachers, and friends should be informed about EDS so they can accept and assist the child.

=== Pain ===
Successful treatment of chronic pain in EDS requires a multidisciplinary team. The ways to manage pain can be to modify pain management techniques used in the normal population. Pain is classified into several types. One is nociceptive, which is caused by an injury sustained to tissues. Another is neuropathic pain, caused by abnormal signals from the nervous system. In many cases, the pain individuals experience is an unequal mix of the two. Physiotherapy (exercise rehabilitation) can be helpful, especially in stabilizing the core and the joints. Stretching exercises must be reduced to slow and gentle stretching to reduce the risks of dislocations or subluxations. Usable methods may include posture reeducation, muscle release, joint mobilization, trunk stabilization, and manual therapy for overworked muscles. Cognitive behavioural therapy is used in many chronic pain patients, especially those who have severe, chronic, life-controlling pain that is unresponsive to treatment. It has not been checked for efficiency in clinical trials. The state of pain management with EDS is considered insufficient.

==== Medications ====
Nonsteroidal anti-inflammatory drugs (NSAIDs) may help if the pain is caused by inflammation. However, long-term use of NSAIDs is often a risk factor for gastrointestinal, renal, and blood-related side effects. It can worsen symptoms of mast cell activation syndrome, a disease that may be associated with EDS. Acetaminophen can be used to avoid the bleeding-related side effects of NSAIDs.

Lidocaine can be applied topically after subluxations and painful gums. It can also be injected into painful areas in the case of musculoskeletal pain.

If the pain is neuropathic in origin, tricyclic antidepressants in low doses, anticonvulsants, and selective norepinephrine reuptake inhibitors can be used.

==== Dislocation and subluxation management ====
When a dislocation or subluxation occurs, muscle spasms and stress tend to follow, increasing pain and reducing the chances of the dislocation/subluxation naturally relieving. Methods to support a joint after such an incident include the usage of a sling to hold the joint in place and allow it to relax. Orthopedic casts are not advised, as there could be pain if unrelaxed muscles are still trying to spasm out against the cast. Other solutions to promote relaxation are heat, gentle massaging, and mental distractions.

=== Surgery ===
The instability of joints, leading to subluxations and joint pain, often requires surgical intervention in people with EDS. Instability of almost all joints can occur, but appears most often in the lower and upper extremities, with the wrist, fingers, shoulder, knee, hip, and ankle being most common.

Common surgical procedures are joint debridement, tendon replacements, capsulorrhaphy, and arthroplasty. Aortic dissection and other such complications of vascular EDS will mandate surgical intervention. After surgery, the degree of stabilization, pain reduction, and people's satisfaction can improve, but surgery does not guarantee an optimal result; affected people and surgeons report being dissatisfied with the results. The consensus is that conservative treatment is more effective than surgery, particularly since people have extra risks of surgical complications due to the disease. Three basic surgical problems arise due to EDS: the tissues are weakened, making them less suitable for surgery; the blood vessels' fragility can cause problems during surgery; and wound healing is often delayed or incomplete. If considering surgical intervention, one should seek care from a surgeon with extensive knowledge and experience in treating people with EDS and joint hypermobility issues.

Local anesthetics, arterial catheters, and central venous catheters cause a higher risk of bruise formation in people with EDS. Some people with EDS are also resistant to local anaesthetics. Resistance to lidocaine and bupivacaine is not uncommon, and mepivacaine tends to work better in people with EDS. Special recommendations for anesthesia are given for people with EDS. Detailed recommendations for anesthesia and perioperative care of people with EDS should be used to improve safety.

Surgery in people with EDS requires careful tissue handling and a longer immobilization afterward.

== Prognosis ==
Outcomes for people with EDS depend on the type of EDS they have. Symptoms vary in severity, even in the same disorder, and the frequency of complications varies. Some people have negligible symptoms, while others are severely restricted in daily life. Extreme joint instability, chronic musculoskeletal pain, degenerative joint disease, frequent injuries, and spinal deformities may limit mobility. Severe spinal deformities may affect breathing. In the case of extreme joint instability, dislocations may result from simple tasks such as rolling over in bed or turning a doorknob. Secondary conditions, such as autonomic dysfunction or cardiovascular problems, occurring in any type, can affect prognosis and quality of life. Severe mobility-related disability is seen more often in hEDS than in classical EDS or vascular EDS.

Although all types of EDS are potentially life-threatening, most people have a normal lifespan. Those with blood vessel fragility, though, have a high risk of fatal complications, including spontaneous arterial rupture, the most common cause of sudden death. The median life expectancy in people with vascular EDS is 48 years.

=== Complications ===
==== Vascular ====
- Pseudoaneurysm
- Vascular lesions (nature is disputed) due to tears in the lining of the arteries or deterioration of congenitally thin and fragile tissue
- Enlarged arteries

==== Gastrointestinal ====
- A 50% risk of colonic perforation exists in vascular Ehlers–Danlos syndrome.

==== Obstetric ====
- Pregnancy increases the likelihood of uterine rupture.
- Maternal mortality is around 12% for the vascular type.
- Uterine hemorrhage can occur during the postpartum recovery.

== Epidemiology ==
Ehlers–Danlos syndromes are estimated to occur in about one in 5,000 births worldwide. Initially, prevalence estimates ranged from one in 250,000 to 500,000 people, but these were soon found to be low, as medical professionals became more adept at diagnosis. EDS may be far more common than the currently accepted estimate due to the wide range of severities with which the disorder presents.

The prevalence of the disorders differs dramatically. The most common is hypermobile EDS, followed by classical EDS. The others are very rare. For example, fewer than 10 infants and children with dermatosparaxis EDS have been described worldwide.

Some types of EDS are more common in Ashkenazi Jews. For example, the chance of being a carrier for dermatosparaxis EDS is one in 2,000 in the general population but one in 248 among Ashkenazi Jews.

Some recent studies have found that EDS is significantly more prevalent in people who identify as transgender or gender-diverse, or who experience gender dysphoria. One review, of a pediatric EDS clinic in the American Midwest between 2020 and 2022, found that 17% of patients identified as trans or gender-diverse, 89% of whom were assigned female at birth. By comparison, roughly 1–2% of adolescents identify as trans or gender-diverse in the US overall. In a 2020 study, among adults undergoing gender-affirming surgery, 2.6% had a diagnosis of EDS—130 times the highest reported prevalence of EDS in the general population.

== History ==
There are multiple possible historical examples of Ehlers-Danlos Syndrome with documentation of hypermobility showing up as early as 400 BC with Hipprocates describing Scythians with lax joints and loose skin. In 1901, a patient with similar symptoms and hypermobile skin was examined by Danish dermatologist Edvard Lauritz Ehlers, who is one of the people recognized in the name of the disorder. Official EDS classification only began in the 1960s with the recognition of six types.

Until 1997, the classification system for EDS included ten specific types and acknowledged that other rarer types existed. At this time, the classification system underwent an overhaul and was reduced to six major types using descriptive titles. Genetic specialists recognize that other types of this condition exist but have only been documented in single families. Except for hypermobility (type 3), the most common type of all ten types, some of the specific variations involved have been identified, and they can be precisely identified by genetic testing; this is valuable due to a great deal of variation in individual cases. Negative genetic test results do not rule out the diagnosis since not all variations have been discovered; therefore, the clinical presentation is crucial.

Forms of EDS in this category may present with soft, mildly stretchable skin, shortened bones, chronic diarrhea, joint hypermobility and dislocation, bladder rupture, or poor wound healing. Inheritance patterns in this group include X-linked recessive, autosomal dominant, and autosomal recessive. Examples of types of related syndromes other than those above reported in the medical literature include:

- 305200: type 5
- 130080: type 8 – unspecified gene, locus 12p13
- 225310: type 10 – unspecified gene, locus 2q34
- 608763: Beasley–Cohen type
- 130070: progeroid form – B4GALT7
- 130090: type unspecified
- 601776: D4ST1-deficient Ehlers–Danlos syndrome (adducted thumb-clubfoot syndrome) CHST14

== Society and culture ==
Many sideshow performers have EDS. Several of them were billed as the Elastic Skin Man, the India Rubber Man, and Frog Boy. They included such well-known individuals (in their time) as Felix Wehrle, James Morris, and Avery Childs. Two performers with EDS currently hold world records. Contortionist Daniel Browning Smith has hypermobile EDS and holds the current Guinness World Record for the most flexible man as of 2018, while Gary "Stretch" Turner, sideshow performer in the Circus Of Horrors, has held the current Guinness World Record for the most elastic skin since 1999, for his ability to stretch the skin on his stomach 6.25 inches.

=== Notable people ===
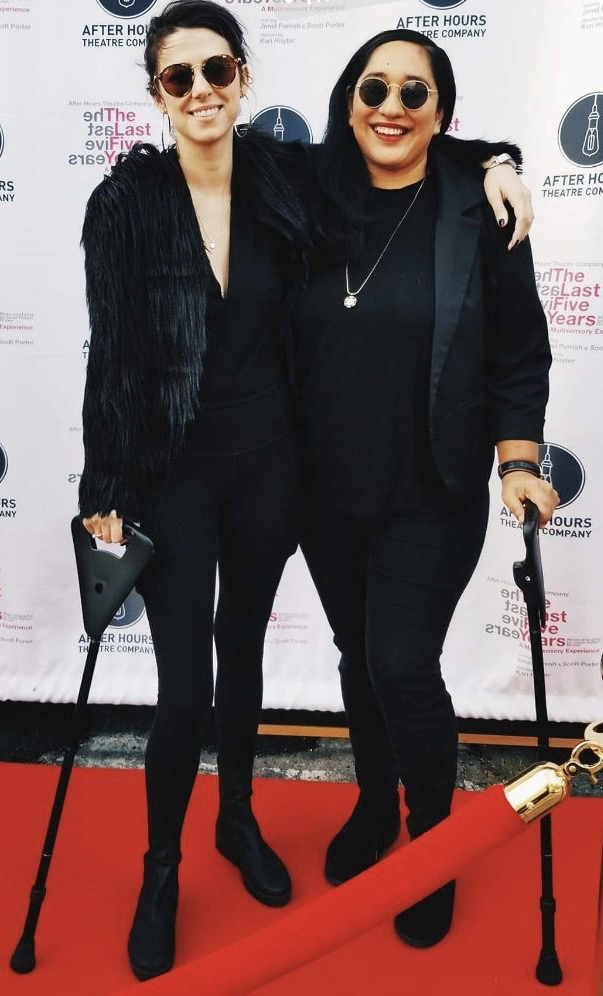
Stevie Boebi and Annie Elainey, who have EDS, standing with mobility aids on the red carpet

- Actress Cherylee Houston has hypermobile EDS. She uses a wheelchair and was the first full-time disabled actress on Coronation Street.
- Drag queen Yvie Oddly, winner of the 11th season of RuPaul's Drag Race
- Eric the Actor, a regular caller to The Howard Stern Show
- Actress and activist Jameela Jamil
- Writer and actress Lena Dunham
- Australian singer Sia
- Singer Halsey
- YouTuber and disability rights activist Annie Elainey
- Miss America 2020 Camille Schrier
- Baroque flautist, musicologist, and broadcast classical music presenter Hannah French
- Deaf singer/songwriter Mandy Harvey
- YouTuber and disability rights activist Jessica Kellgren-Fozard
- Singer-songwriter, author and artist Martha Marlow
- Pornographic actor and writer Lorelei Lee
- Reality show contestant Trevor Jones, dead from the vascular form of the disorder
- Scrunchie creator Rommy Hunt Revson, dead from a ruptured aorta
- Japanese voice actress and singer Tomori Kusunoki
- Chaz Lucius, an American former professional ice hockey player

=== Representation in media ===
==== Literature ====
The fantasy novel Fourth Wing by Rebecca Yarros presents a main character, Violet Sorrengail, who has an unnamed chronic condition that aligns closely with EDS symptoms. When asked about this connection, Rebecca Yarros agrees with the connection but says EDS goes unnamed due to the level of medical knowledge present in her story's world. Yarros has EDS and included it as a representation of her condition.

In the 2024 novel Icarus by K. Ancrum, the titular protagonist has EDS.

==== Television ====
Grey's Anatomy, a long-running TV series, approached the topic of EDS in its 13th season. In the episode "Falling Slowly", the show's doctors are confronted with confusion when faced with diagnosing a patient. Due to complex and contradicting symptoms presented by the patient, the show's doctors ultimately give the diagnosis of EDS. This episode was based on conversations held by producers who talked with a patient and doctor who have EDS.

== Other animals ==
Ehlers–Danlos–like syndromes are hereditary in Himalayan cats, some domestic shorthair cats, and certain breeds of cattle. It is seen as a sporadic condition in domestic dogs, with higher frequency in English Springers. It has a similar treatment and prognosis. Animals with the condition should not be bred, as the condition can be inherited.

Degenerative suspensory ligament desmitis is a similar condition seen in many breeds of horses. It was originally notated in the Peruvian Paso and thought to be a condition of overwork and older age, but it is being recognized in all age groups and all activity levels. It has been noted in newborn foals.

Animal EDS

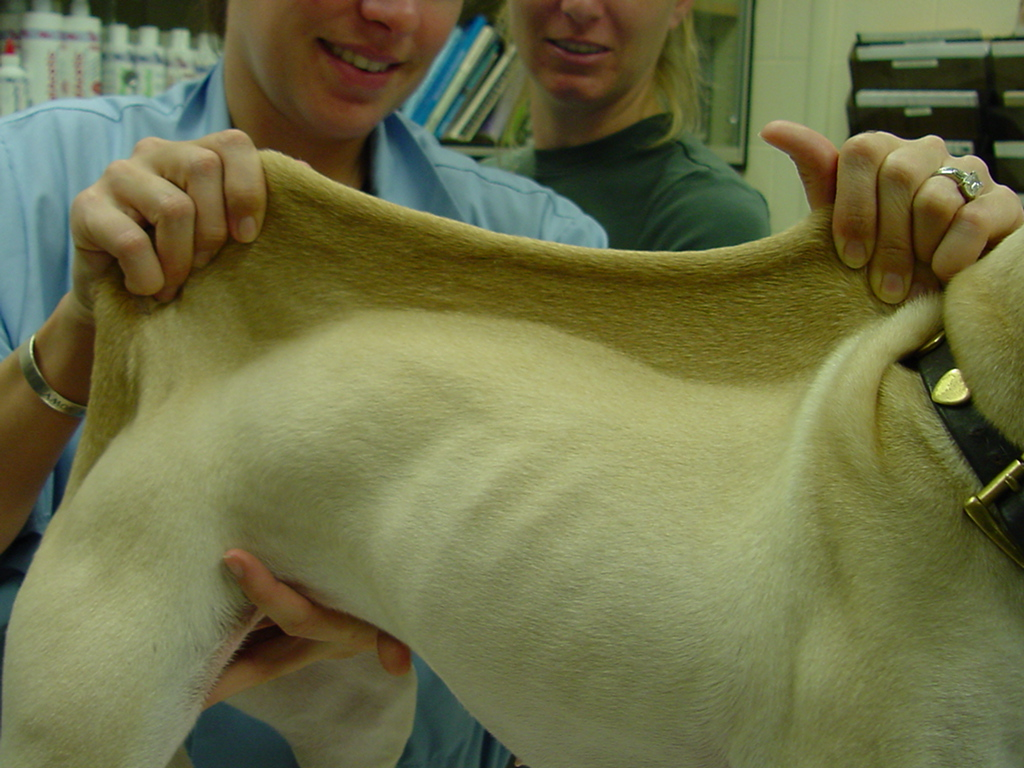
EDS in a dog

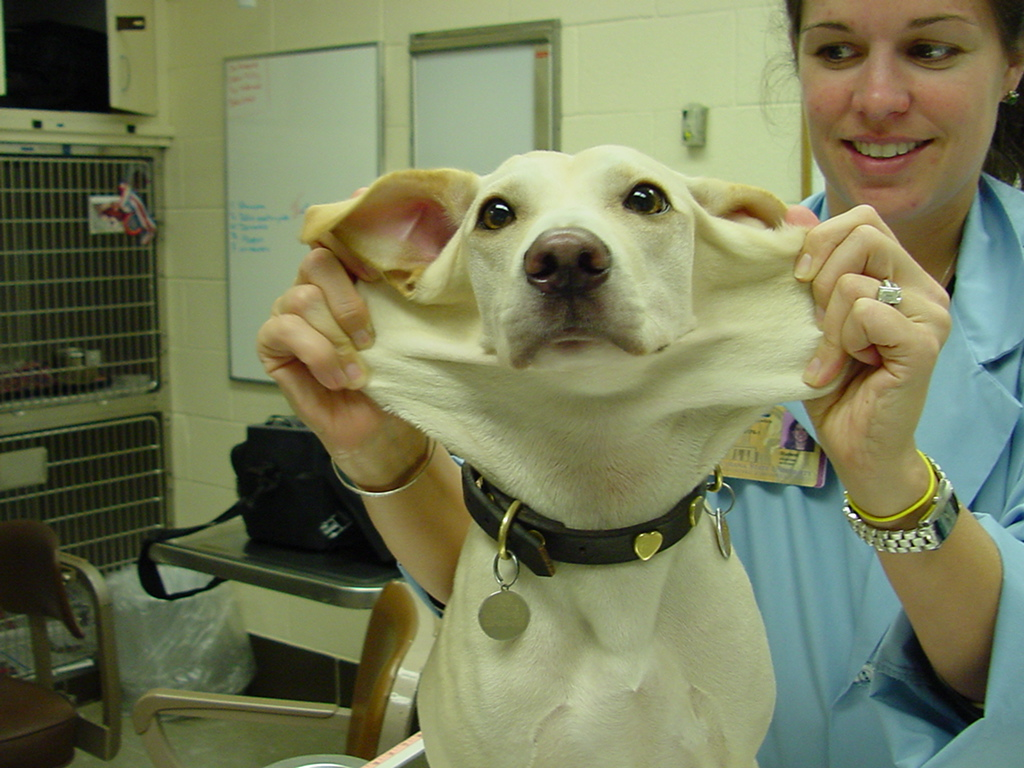
Same dog with EDS

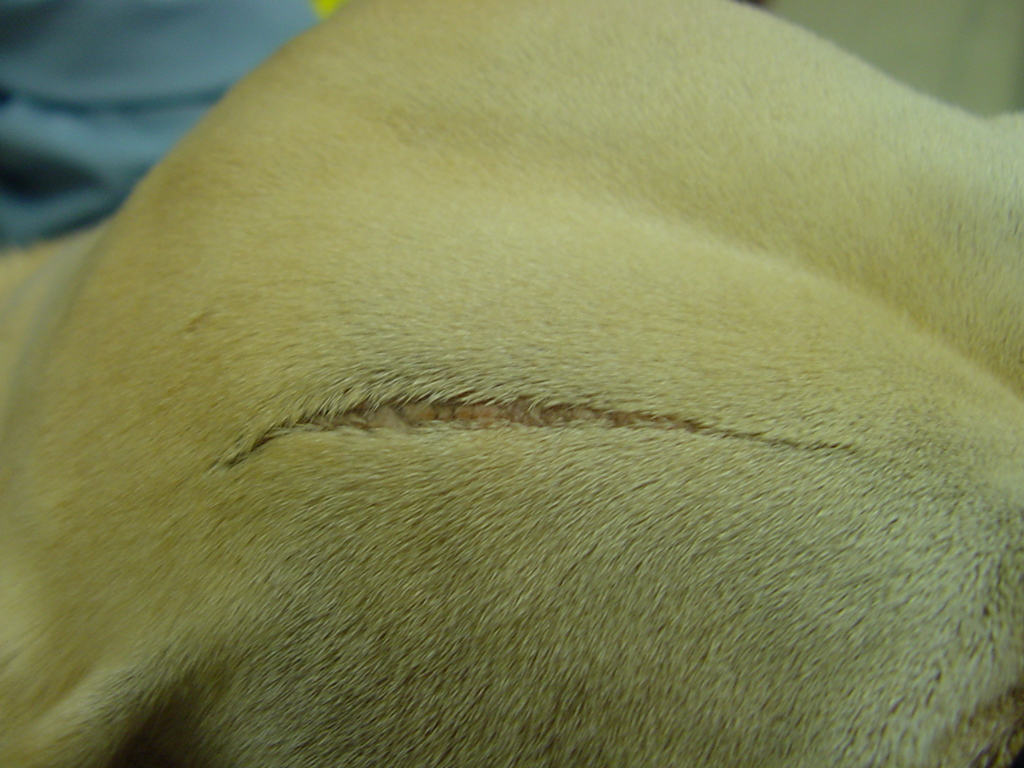
EDS in the same dog showing an atrophic scar

== See also ==
- Dermatology
- Ehlers-Danlos Society
- Hypermobility spectrum disorder
- List of skin conditions
