= Swan neck deformity =

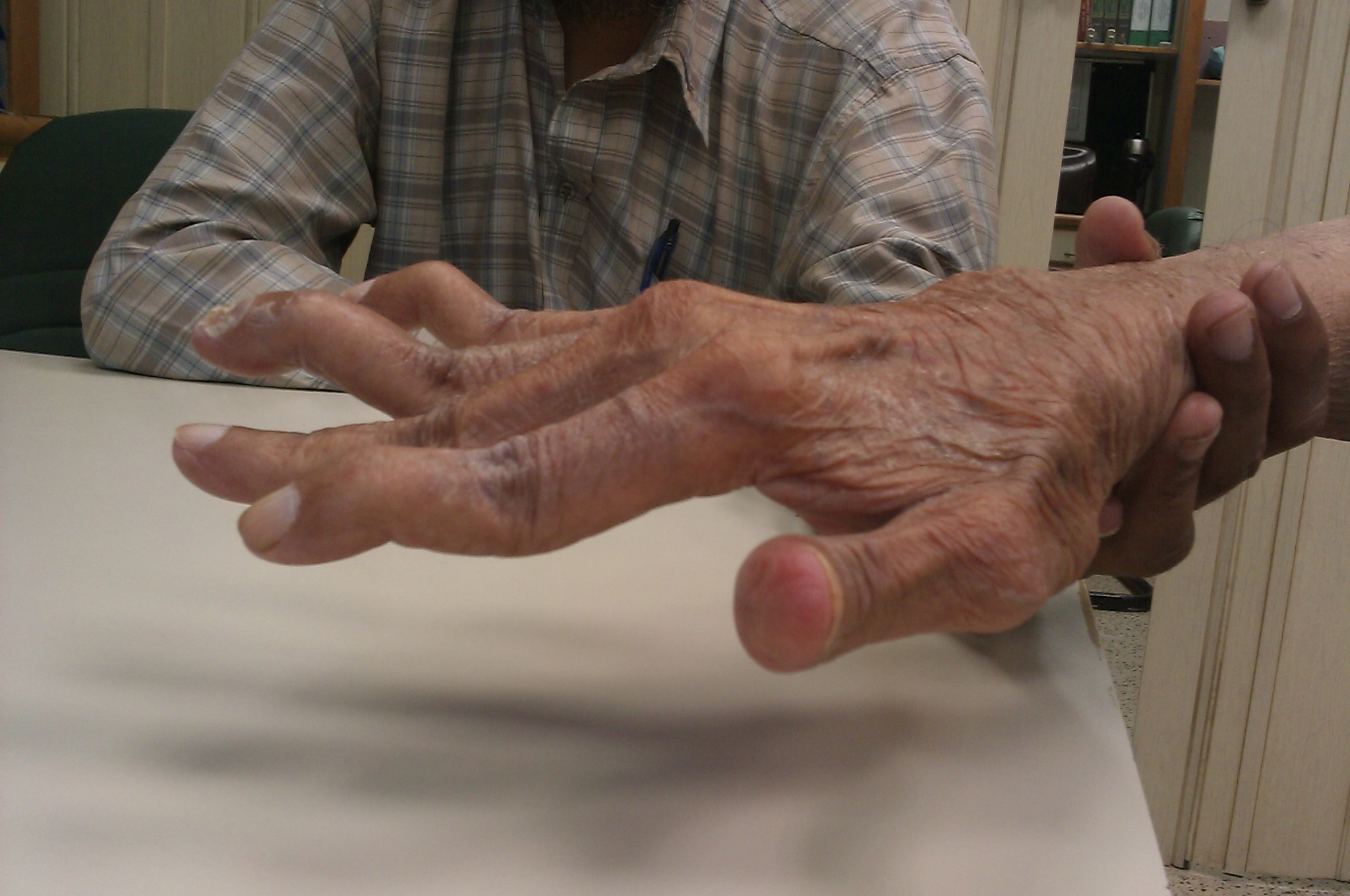
- Swan neck deformity in a 65-year-old rheumatoid arthritis patient.
- Specialty: Orthopedic

Swan neck deformity is a deformed position of the finger, in which the joint closest to the fingertip is permanently bent toward the palm while the nearest joint to the palm is bent away from it (DIP flexion with PIP hyperextension). It is commonly caused by injury, hypermobility or inflammatory conditions like rheumatoid arthritis or sometimes familial (congenital, like Ehlers–Danlos syndrome).

== Pathophysiology ==
Swan neck deformity has many of possible causes arising from the DIP, PIP, or even the MCP joints. In all cases, there is a stretching of the volar plate at the PIP joint to allow hyperextension, plus some damage to the attachment of the extensor tendon to the base of the distal phalanx that produces a hyperflexed mallet finger. Duck bill deformity is a similar condition affecting the thumb (which cannot have true swan neck deformity because it does not have enough joints).

== Diagnosis ==
Diagnosis of swan neck deformity is mainly clinical. MRI of the hand may suggest volar plate attenuation of PIP and extensor tendon damage for DIP Genetic screening tests such as for CMT disease may also be indicated.

== Treatment ==
Splinting for fingers. Passive stretching and clearing the deformity.
