= FKBP14 =

Protein-coding gene in humans

Identifiers
- Aliases: FKBP14, EDSKMH, FKBP22, IPBP12, FK506 binding protein 14, EDSKSCL2, FKBP prolyl isomerase 14
- External IDs: OMIM: 614505; MGI: 2387639; GeneCards: FKBP14
Available structures
PDB	Ortholog search: PDBe RCSB
PDB	List of PDB id codes 4DIP, 4MSP
Enzyme activity
EC #	BRENDA	ExPASy	KEGG	MetaCyc
5.2.1.8	↗	↗	↗	↗

Gene location (Human)
Chr.	Chromosome 7 (human)
Band	7p14.3	Start	30,010,587 bp
Band	7p14.3	End	30,026,702 bp

Gene location (Mouse)
Chr.	Chromosome 6 (mouse)
Band	6|6 B3	Start	54,554,589 bp
Band	6|6 B3	End	54,574,293 bp
RNA expression pattern
Bgee	Human / Mouse (ortholog); Top expressed in: tibia; corpus epididymis; cartilage tissue; stromal cell of endometrium; smooth muscle tissue; tail of epididymis; right ventricle; skin of hip; skin of thigh; islet of Langerhans / Top expressed in: calvaria; otolith organ; utricle; umbilical cord; dermis; efferent ductule; molar; body of femur; vas deferens; hand; More reference expression data
BioGPS	n/a
Gene ontology
Molecular function	calcium ion binding; FK506 binding; isomerase activity; peptidyl-prolyl cis-trans isomerase activity; metal ion binding
Cellular component	endoplasmic reticulum lumen; endoplasmic reticulum; cytoplasm
Biological process	IRE1-mediated unfolded protein response; chaperone-mediated protein folding; protein peptidyl-prolyl isomerization
Sources:Amigo / QuickGO
Orthologs
Databases	NCBI: entry; OMA: entry
Species	Human	Mouse
Entrez	55033	231997
Ensembl	ENSG00000106080	ENSMUSG00000038074
UniProt	Q9NWM8	P59024
RefSeq (mRNA)	NM_017946	NM_153573; NM_001363792; NM_001363793
RefSeq (protein)	NP_060416	NP_705801; NP_001350721; NP_001350722
Location (UCSC)	Chr 7: 30.01 – 30.03 Mb	Chr 6: 54.55 – 54.57 Mb
PubMed search
- Wikidata
View/Edit Human	View/Edit Mouse

FKBP14 is a gene which codes for a structural protein named FKBP prolyl isomerase 14.

== Function ==
This protein is believed to aid in the process of procollagen folding and is located in the endoplasmic reticulum that functions to process and transport proteins. Procollagens are collagen precursors located in the extracellular matrix that give tissues elasticity, strength, and support. This gene is involved in patterning the collagen structure. FKBP prolyl isomerase 14 may also be involved in altering other factors in the extracellular matrix.

== Clinical significance ==
Mutations of this gene are associated with the kyphoscoliotic type of Ehlers–Danlos syndrome. This condition is characterized by a high range of joint movement, muscle atrophy, curved spine, and delicate cardiovascular vessels. These symptoms are brought about by a loss of the protein which results in a disruption of endoplasmic reticulum activities and extracellular matrix organization. FKBP14 mRNA levels are found higher in ovarian cancer tissues than healthy ovarian tissue and knocked down expression of FKBP14 by lentiviral shRNA leads to an impaired proliferative ability of ovarian cancer cells.
