= Hypermobility spectrum disorder =

Heritable connective tissue disorder

- Other names: Hypermobility syndrome Joint hypermobility syndrome
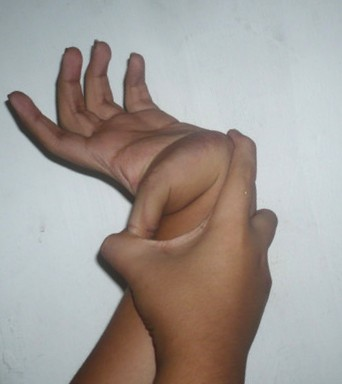
- Hypermobile thumb
- Specialty: Rheumatology, genetics
- Symptoms: Joint hypermobility; musculoskeletal pain; fatigue; dislocations and subluxations; dysautonomia
- Types: Generalized HSD, Localized HSD, Peripheral HSD, Historical HSD
- Causes: Genetic
- Diagnostic method: Beighton score
- Differential diagnosis: Ehlers–Danlos syndrome; IBS; Chronic fatigue syndrome; Fibromyalgia; Functional gastrointestinal disorders; POTS
- Treatment: Physiotherapy, Psychotherapy, Occupational Therapy
- Frequency: 1 in 500 (Wales, UK)

Hypermobility spectrum disorders (HSD) are a group of heritable connective tissue disorders where joints are flexible enough to cause problems such as instability and pain. Different forms and sub-types have been distinguished, but it does not include asymptomatic joint hypermobility, colloquially known as double-jointedness, nor does it include Ehlers–Danlos syndromes.

This condition was called "joint hypermobility syndrome" (JHS) until 2017, when it was renamed and subtypes were defined.

There is a strong association between HSD and neurodevelopmental disorders such as attention deficit hyperactivity disorder and autism spectrum disorder.

== Classification ==
Hypermobility spectrum disorders are diagnosed when individuals have symptomatic joint hypermobility but do not meet the criteria for other connective tissue disorders, such as Ehlers–Danlos syndrome.

In March 2017, the International Consortium on the Ehlers-Danlos Syndromes published a revised classification naming two syndromes: hypermobile EDS (hEDS), which has narrowly defined criteria, and hypermobility spectrum disorder (HSD) for those with some but not all the features of hEDS. This reclassification aimed to address the overlap between joint hypermobility syndrome and what was previously termed EDS-hypermobile type (EDS-HT). Patients who have a diagnosis of EDS-HT or JHS will fall into one of these two new categories.

Hypermobility spectrum disorder does not include people with asymptomatic hypermobility or people with double-jointedness but no other symptoms. Hypermobile Ehlers–Danlos syndrome and hypermobility spectrum disorders may be equally severe.

HSD is further classified into different subtypes, which include:

- Generalized HSD (G-HSD): Involves widespread joint hypermobility affecting multiple joints.
- Localized HSD (L-HSD): Limited to a few joints, without generalized involvement.
- Peripheral HSD (P-HSD): Affects joints in the hands and feet.
- Historical HSD (H-HSD): Diagnosed when there is a history of joint hypermobility that is no longer present, along with other symptoms.

These classifications help in identifying the specific pattern and extent of joint hypermobility and in determining the appropriate management strategies.

== Signs and symptoms ==
Some common symptoms of hypermobility spectrum disorder may include:

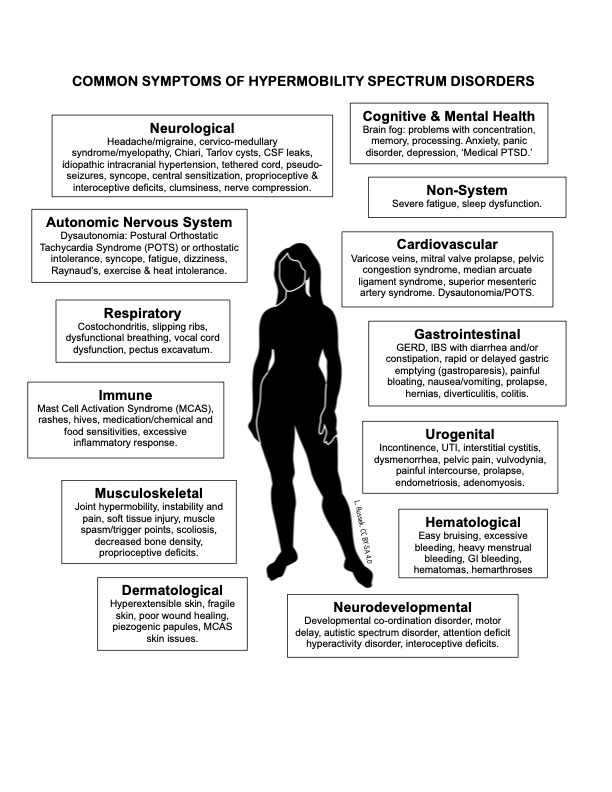
Hypermobility Spectrum Disorders symptoms and comorbidities by body system

=== Musculoskeletal symptoms ===
- Joint instability and soft tissue injuries: Dislocations, subluxations, or damage to muscles, ligaments, tendons, synovium, or cartilage as a result of excessive joint movement.
- Chronic pain: Recurrent joint pain that can develop into hyperalgesia, with a higher rate of small fiber neuropathy in some individuals.
- Disturbed proprioception: Reduced proprioception and muscle weakness, creating a cycle of increasing activity limitations

=== Extra-articular symptoms ===
- Autonomic dysfunction/dysautonomia: Symptoms may include orthostatic intolerance, dizziness, palpitations, Raynaud's phenomenon, and postural orthostatic tachycardia syndrome (POTS).
- Functional gastrointestinal disorders: Symptoms such as nausea, vomiting, diarrhea, constipation, bloating, early satiety, reflux, and irritable bowel syndrome.
- Pelvic and bladder dysfunction: Symptoms include pelvic pain, dyspareunia, bladder dysfunction, organ prolapse, and association with conditions like polycystic ovaries, fibroids, or endometriosis.
- Fatigue: Profound fatigue, often linked to sleep disturbances, non-restorative sleep, and nocturnal musculoskeletal pain, affecting concentration and quality of life.
- Mood disorders: Anxiety, depression, panic attacks, and emotional distress, often related to chronic pain and reduced physical function.

Symptom expression varies widely, with different combinations and severities seen in individuals. Symptoms may fluctuate over time, often triggered by physical exertion, stress, illness, or injury.

== Diagnosis ==
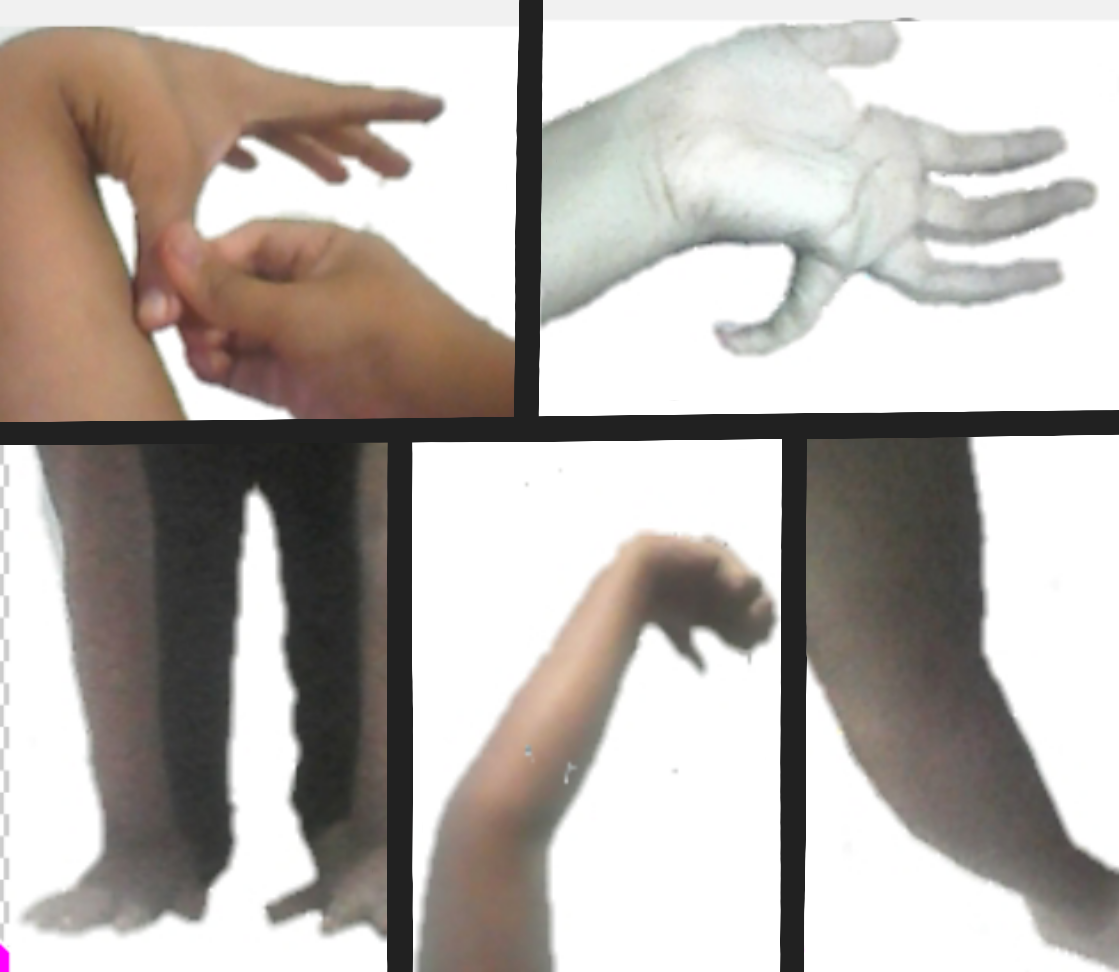
Beighton score

The Beighton score can be used to determine generalised joint hypermobility (GJH) related to hypermobility syndrome. The newer term "generalised hypermobility spectrum disorder" includes people with generalised joint hypermobility, often determined using the Beighton score, and other symptoms. Those who do not meet the Beighton score criteria may be diagnosed with historical joint hypermobility spectrum disorder, peripheral hypermobility spectrum disorder, or localised hypermobility spectrum disorder.

In comparison to the diagnostic criteria of hypermobile Ehlers–Danlos syndrome, the criteria for hypermobile spectrum disorder are less strict. However, these criteria are differentiated from criteria of other EDS types and therefore its less-strict criteria are only comparable to the criteria of hEDS. As those with HSD experience a considerable amount of discomfort, it is important to focus on the treatment, not the labels. The severity of each condition can be equivalent. In particular, musculoskeletal involvement is a requirement for diagnosis with any form of hypermobility spectrum disorder but not for hypermobile Ehlers–Danlos syndrome. Like hypermobile Ehlers–Danlos syndrome, hypermobility spectrum disorders are associated with orthostatic tachycardia, gastrointestinal disorders, and pelvic and bladder dysfunction.

== Treatment ==
There is no direct cure for Hypermobility Spectrum Disorder, but its symptoms can be treated. Physiotherapy, particularly exercise, is the main treatment for the condition, although there is only limited evidence for its effectiveness.

== Prevalence ==
While the heritability of hypermobility is strong, specific genes implicated in the condition have not been identified.

Prevalence of HSD alone is unknown, though previous estimates have placed the combined prevalence of hEDS and HSD between 194.2 per 100 000 (0.19%) or 1 in 500 people. Other studies have suggested that it affects around 3% of the UK population. The condition is relatively common in those attending musculoskeletal clinics.
