= Elastic fiber =

Type of connective tissue in animals

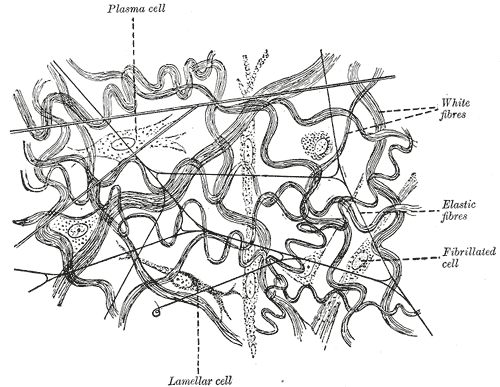
- Subcutaneous tissue from a young rabbit. Highly magnified. (Elastic fibers labeled at right)

Identifiers
- FMA: 63868

Elastic fibers (or yellow fibers) are an essential component of the extracellular matrix composed of bundles of proteins (elastin) which are produced by a number of different cell types including fibroblasts, endothelial, smooth muscle, and airway epithelial cells. These fibers are able to stretch many times their length, and snap back to their original length when relaxed without loss of energy. Elastic fibers include elastin, elaunin and oxytalan.

Elastic fibers are formed via elastogenesis, a highly complex process involving several key proteins including fibulin-4, fibulin-5, latent transforming growth factor β binding protein 4, and microfibril associated protein 4. In this process tropoelastin, the soluble monomeric precursor to elastic fibers is produced by elastogenic cells and chaperoned to the cell surface. Following excretion from the cell, tropoelastin self associates into ~200 nm particles by coacervation, an entropically driven process involving interactions between tropoelastin's hydrophobic domains, which is mediated by glycosaminoglycans, heparan, and other molecules. These particles then fuse to give rise to 1-2 micron spherules which continue to grow as they move down from the cells surface before being deposited onto fibrillin microfibrillar scaffolds.

Following deposition onto microfibrils tropoelastin is insolubilized via extensive crosslinking by members of the lysyl oxidase and lysyl oxidase like family of copper-dependent amine oxidases into amorphous elastin, a highly resilient, insoluble polymer that is metabolically stable over a human lifespan. These two families of enzymes react with the many lysine residues present in tropoelastin to form reactive aldehydes and allysine via oxidative deamination.

These reactive aldehydes and allysines can react with other lysine and allysine residues to form desmosine, isodesmosine, and a number of other polyfunctional crosslinks that join surrounding molecules of tropoelastin into an extensively crosslinked elastin matrix. This process creates a diverse array of intramolecular and intermolecular crosslinks These unique crosslinks are responsible for elastin's durability and persistence. Maintenance of crosslinked elastin is carried out by a number of proteins including lysyl oxidase-like 1 protein.

Mature elastic fibers consist of an amorphous elastin core surrounded by a glycosaminoglycans, heparan sulphate, and number of other proteins such as microfibrillar-associated glycoproteins, fibrillin, fibullin, and the elastin receptor.

== Distribution ==
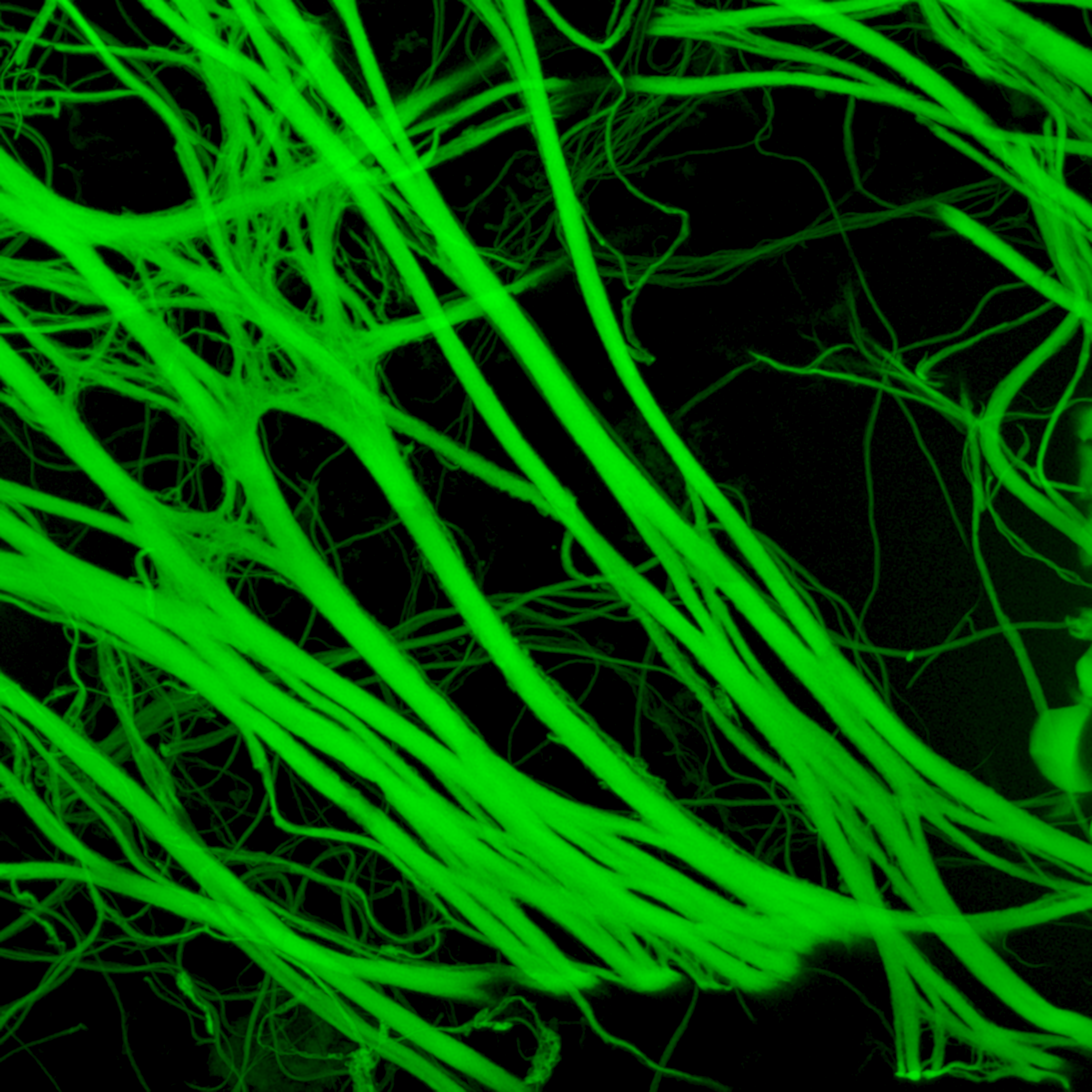
Thick elastic fibers from the visceral pleura (outer lining) of the human lung

Elastic fibers are found in the skin, lungs, arteries, veins, connective tissue proper, elastic cartilage, periodontal ligament, fetal tissue and other tissues which must undergo mechanical stretching. In the lung there are thick and thin elastic fibers.

Elastic fibers are absent from scarring, keloids and dermatofibromas and they are decreased greatly, or are absent in anetodermas.

== Histology ==
Elastic fibers stain well with aldehyde fuchsin, orcein, and Weigert's elastic stain in histological sections.

The permanganate-bisulfite-toluidine blue reaction is a highly selective and sensitive method for demonstrating elastic fibers under polarizing optics. The induced birefringence demonstrates the highly ordered molecular structure of the elastin molecules in the elastic fiber. This is not readily apparent under normal optics.

== Defects and disease ==
There is evidence to believe that certain defects of any components of the elastic matrix may impair and alter the structural appearance of elastic and collagen fibers.

Cutis laxa and Williams syndrome have elastic matrix defects that have been directly associated with alterations in the elastin gene.

Alpha-1 antitrypsin deficiency is a genetic disorder where elastin is excessively degraded by elastase, a degrading protein released by neutrophils during the inflammatory response. This leads most often to emphysema and liver disease in affected individuals.

Buschke–Ollendorff syndrome, Menkes disease, pseudoxanthoma elasticum, and Marfan's syndrome have been associated with defects in copper metabolism and lysyl oxidase or defects in the microfibril (defects in fibrillin, or fibullin for example).

Hurler disease, a lysosomal storage disease, is associated with an altered elastic matrix.

Hypertension and some congenital heart defects are associated with alterations in the great arteries, arteries, and arterioles with alterations in the elastic matrix.

== Elastosis ==
Elastosis is the buildup of elastic fibers in tissues, and is a form of degenerative disease. There are a multitude of causes, but the most commons cause is actinic elastosis of the skin, also known as solar elastosis, which is caused by prolonged and excessive sun exposure, a process known as photoaging. Uncommon causes of skin elastosis include elastosis perforans serpiginosa, perforating calcific elastosis and linear focal elastosis.

Skin elastosis causes
Condition	Distinctive features	Histopathology
Actinic elastosis (most common, also called solar elastosis)	Elastin replacing collagen fibers of the papillary dermis and reticular dermis	
Elastosis perforans serpiginosa	Degenerated elastic fibers and transepidermal perforating canals (arrow in image points at one of them)	
Perforating calcific elastosis	Clumping of short elastic fibers in the dermis.	
Linear focal elastosis	Accumulation of fragmented elastotic material within the papillary dermis and transcutaneous elimination of elastotic fibers.	

== See also ==
- Elastic artery
