= Ultraviolet index =

Measurement of strength of sunburn-producing ultraviolet (UV) radiation

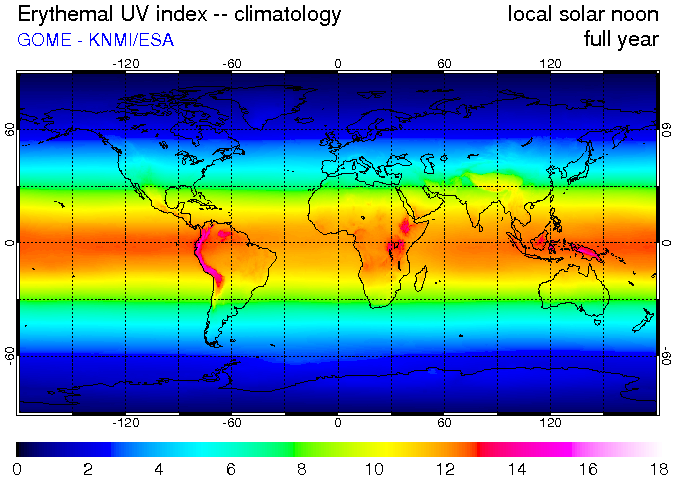
Average UV at solar noon 1996-2002 (European Space Agency)

The ultraviolet index, or UV index, is an international standard measurement of the strength of the sunburn-producing ultraviolet (UV) radiation at a particular place and time. It is primarily used in daily and hourly forecasts aimed at the general public. The UV index is designed as an open-ended linear scale, directly proportional to the intensity of UV radiation, and adjusting for wavelength based on what causes human skin to sunburn. The purpose of the UV index is to help people effectively protect themselves from UV radiation, which has health benefits in moderation but in excess causes sunburn, skin aging, DNA damage, skin cancer, immunosuppression, and eye damage, such as cataracts.

The scale was developed by Canadian scientists in 1992, and then adopted and standardized by the UN's World Health Organization and World Meteorological Organization in 1994. Public health organizations recommend that people protect themselves (for example, by applying sunscreen to the skin and wearing a hat and sunglasses) if they spend substantial time outdoors when the UV index is 3 or higher; see the table below for more detailed recommendations.

== Description ==
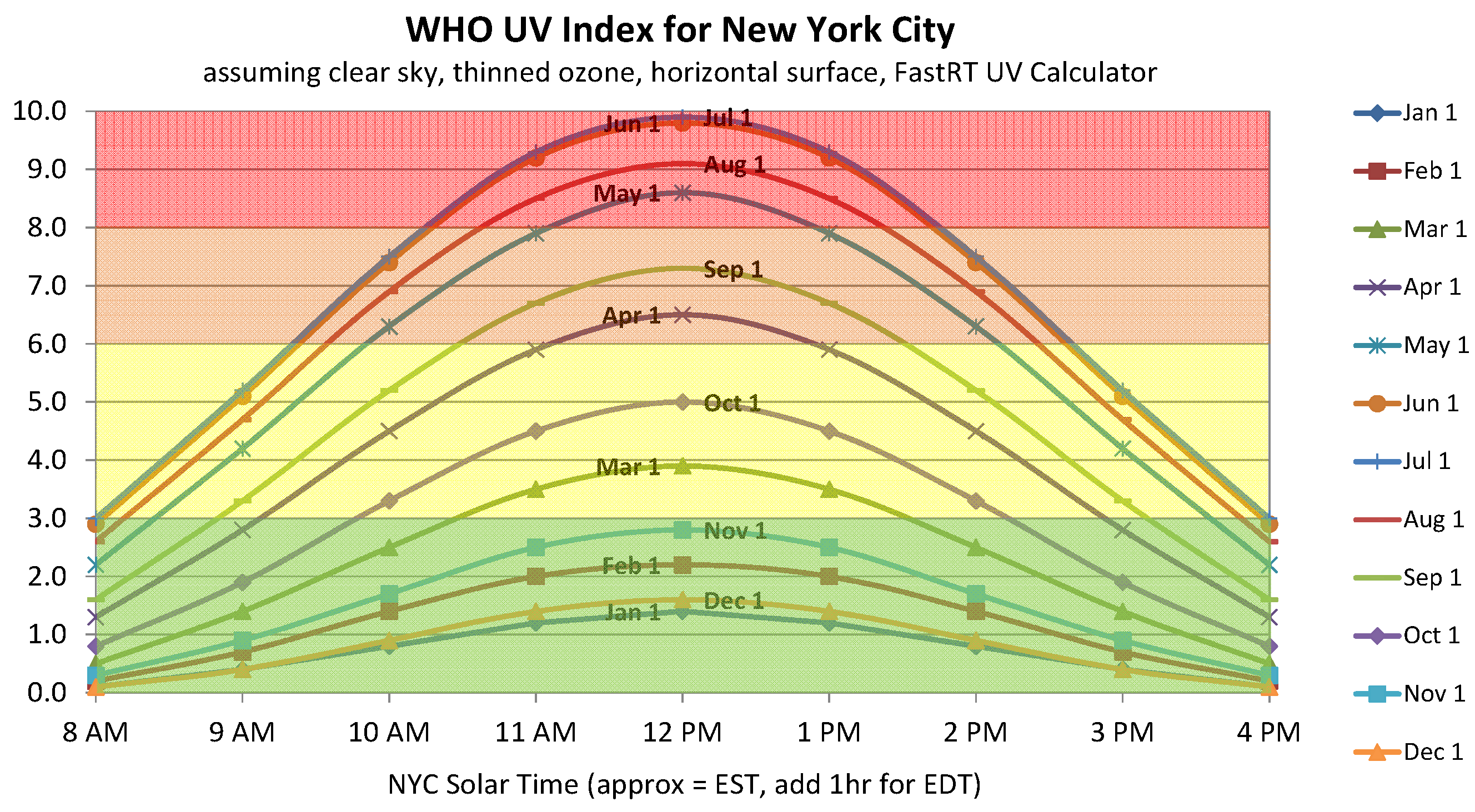
Typical variation of UV index by time of day and time of year, around 40.71 -74.01, based on FastRT UV Calculator

The UV index is a linear scale that measures the intensity of UV radiation with respect to sunburn. For example, assuming similar spectral power distributions, radiation with a UV index of 12 is twice as intense as radiation at a UV index of 6. For a wide range of timescales, sunburn in response to controlled UV radiation occurs in proportion to the total number of photons delivered, not varying with the intensity or duration of exposure. Therefore, under similar conditions, a person who develops a sunburn after 30 minutes of exposure to UV index 6 radiation would most likely develop a sunburn of similar severity after 15 minutes of exposure to UV index 12 radiation, since it is twice the intensity but half the duration. This linear scale is unlike other common environmental scales such as decibels or the Richter scale, which are logarithmic (the severity multiplies for each step on the scale, growing exponentially).

An index of 0 corresponds to zero UV radiation, as is essentially the case at night. An index of 10 corresponds roughly to midday summer sunlight in the tropics with a clear sky when the UV index was originally designed; now summertime index values in the tens are common for tropical latitudes, mountainous altitudes, areas with ice/water reflectivity and areas with above-average ozone layer depletion.

While the UV index can be calculated from a direct measurement of the UV spectral power at a given location, as some inexpensive portable devices are able to approximate, the value given in weather reports is usually a prediction based on a computer model. Although this may be in error (especially when cloud conditions are unexpectedly heavy or light), it is usually within ±1 UV index unit as that which would be measured.

When the UV index is presented on a daily basis, it represents UV intensity around the time of solar culmination (when the Sun reaches its highest point during the day), called solar noon, halfway between sunrise and sunset. This typically occurs between 11:30 and 12:30, or between 12:30 and 13:30 in areas where daylight saving time is being observed. Predictions are made by a computer model that accounts for the effects of Sun–Earth distance, solar zenith angle, total ozone amount, tropospheric aerosol optical depth, elevation, snow/ice reflectivity, and cloud transmission, all of which influence the amount of UV radiation at the surface.

== Technical definition ==
Sunburn effect (as measured by the UV index) is the product of the sunlight power spectrum (radiation intensity) and the erythemal action spectrum (skin sensitivity) across the range of UV wavelengths.

Ultraviolet radiation in sunlight is divided into UVA (315–400 nm), UVB (280–315 nm) and UVC (100–280 nm). UVC and most UVB are absorbed by the atmosphere, so approximately 95% of the ultraviolet reaching the Earth's surface is UVA and about 5% is UVB. The UV index is a number linearly related to the intensity of sunburn-producing UV radiation at a given point on the Earth's surface. It cannot be simply related to the irradiance (measured in W/m^{2}) because the UV of greatest concern occupies a spectrum of wavelengths from 295 to 325 nm, and shorter wavelengths have already been absorbed a great deal when they arrive at the Earth's surface. However, skin damage from sunburn is related to wavelength, the shorter wavelengths being much more damaging. The UV power spectrum (expressed as watts per square meter per nanometer of wavelength) is therefore multiplied by a weighting curve known as the CIE-standard McKinlay–Diffey erythemal action spectrum. There are some older formulas for the spectrum, resulting in differences of up to 2%. The result is integrated over the whole spectrum. This gives a weighted figure called the Diffey-weighted UV irradiance (DUV) or the erythemal dose rate. Since the normalization weight is 1 for wavelengths between 250nm and 298nm, a source of a given DUV irradiance causes roughly as much sunburn as a radiation source emitting those wavelengths at the same intensity, although inaccuracies in the spectrum definition and varying reactions by skin type may mean this relationship does not actually hold. When the index was designed, the typical midday summer sunlight was around 250 mW/m^{2}. Thus, for convenience, the DUV is divided by 25 mW/m^{2} to produce an index nominally from 0 to 11+, though ozone depletion is now resulting in higher values. Because the index is weighted for sunburn, which is caused mainly by UVB, it says little about UVA exposure, so a low UV index does not necessarily mean low exposure to the UVA that causes photoaging and deeper skin damage.

To illustrate the spectrum weighting principle, the incident power density in midday summer sunlight is typically 0.6 mW/(m^{2}) at 295 nm, 74 mW/(m^{2}) at 305 nm, and 478 mW/(m^{2}) at 325 nm. (Note the huge absorption that has already taken place in the atmosphere at short wavelengths.) The erythemal weighting factors applied to these figures are 1.0, 0.22, and 0.003 respectively. (Also note the huge increase in sunburn damage caused by the shorter wavelengths; e.g., for the same irradiance, 305 nm is 22% as damaging as 295 nm, and 325 nm is 0.3% as damaging as 295 nm.) Integration of these values using all the intermediate weightings over the full spectral range of 290 nm to 400 nm produces a figure of 264 mW/m^{2} (the DUV), which is then divided by 25 mW/m^{2} to give a UV index of 10.6.

== History ==
After sporadic attempts by various meteorologists to define a "sunburn index" and growing concern about ozone depletion, Environment Canada scientists James B. Kerr, C. Thomas McElroy, and David I. Wardle invented the modern UV index in Toronto, Ontario. Environment Canada launched it as part of the weather forecast on May 27, 1992, making Canada the first country in the world to issue official predictions of UV levels for the next day. Many other countries followed suit with their own UV indices. Initially, the methods of calculating and reporting a UV index varied significantly from country to country. A global UV index, first standardized by the World Health Organization and World Meteorological Organization in 1994, gradually replaced the inconsistent regional versions, specifying not only a uniform calculation method (the Canadian definition) but also standard colors and graphics for visual media.

On December 29, 2003, a world-record ground-level UV index of 43.3 was detected at Licancabur volcano located at the Bolivian-Chilean border, though other scientists dispute readings higher than 26.

In 2005, Australia and the United States launched the UV Alert. While the two countries have different baseline UV intensity requirements before issuing an alert, their common goal is to raise awareness of the dangers of over-exposure to the Sun on days with intense UV radiation.

In 2007, the United Nations honored UV index inventors Kerr, McElroy, and Wardle with the Innovators Award for their far-reaching work on reducing public health risks from UV radiation. In the same year, a survey among meteorologists ranked the development of the UV index as #11 on The Weather Channel's 100 Biggest Weather Moments.

== Index usage ==
The recommendations below are for average adults with lightly tanned skin (Fitzpatrick scale of skin colour: Type II). Those with darker skin (Type IV+) are more likely to withstand greater sun exposure, while extra precautions are needed for children, seniors, particularly fair-skinned adults, and those who have greater sun sensitivity for medical reasons or from UV exposure in previous days.

When the day's predicted UV index is within various numerical ranges, the recommendations for protection are as follows:

UV index	Media graphic color	Risk of harm from unprotected sun exposure, for the average adult	Recommended protection
0–2	Green	"Low"	A UV index reading of 0 to 2 means low danger from the Sun's UV rays for the average person. Wear sunglasses on bright days. If you burn easily, cover up and use broad spectrum SPF 15+ sunscreen. Bright surfaces, sand, water, and snow, will increase UV exposure.
3–5	Yellow	"Moderate"	A UV index reading of 3 to 5 means moderate risk of harm from unprotected sun exposure. Stay in shade near midday, when the sun is strongest. If outdoors, wear sun protective clothing, a wide-brimmed hat, and UV-blocking sunglasses. Generously apply broad spectrum SPF 50+ sunscreen every 1.5 hours, even on cloudy days, and after swimming or sweating. Bright surfaces, such as sand, water, and snow, will increase UV exposure.
6–7	Orange	"High"	A UV index reading of 6 to 7 means high risk of harm from unprotected sun exposure. Protection against skin and eye damage is needed. Reduce time in the sun between 10 a.m. and 4 p.m. If outdoors, seek shade and wear sun protective clothing, a wide-brimmed hat, and UV-blocking sunglasses. Generously apply broad spectrum SPF 50+ sunscreen every 1.5 hours, even on cloudy days, and after swimming or sweating. Bright surfaces, such as sand, water, and snow, will increase UV exposure.
8–10	Red	"Very high"	A UV index reading of 8 to 10 means very high risk of harm from unprotected sun exposure. Take extra precautions because unprotected skin and eyes will be damaged and can burn quickly. Minimize sun exposure between 10 a.m. and 4 p.m. If outdoors, seek shade and wear sun protective clothing, a wide-brimmed hat, and UV-blocking sunglasses. Generously apply broad spectrum SPF 50+ sunscreen every 1.5 hours, even on cloudy days, and after swimming or sweating. Bright surfaces, such as sand, water, and snow, will increase UV exposure.
11+	Violet	"Extreme"	A UV index reading of 11 or more means extreme risk of harm from unprotected sun exposure. Take all precautions because unprotected skin and eyes can burn in minutes. Try to avoid sun exposure between 10 a.m. and 4 p.m. If outdoors, seek shade and wear sun protective clothing, a wide-brimmed hat, and UV-blocking sunglasses. Generously apply broad spectrum SPF 50+ sunscreen every 1.5 hours, even on cloudy days, and after swimming or sweating. Bright surfaces, such as sand, water, and snow, will increase UV exposure.

Some sunshine prediction and advice apps have been released. These use the UV index and Fitzpatrick scale skin type to calculate the maximum exposure time before receiving a sunburn. The Fitzpatrick scale is not sufficient to precisely estimate the minimum radiation dose needed for sunburn. Research has found broad variation within and between populations, e.g. for skin type V subjects the MED in the US is 60–100 mJ/cm^{2} vs. 120–240 mJ/cm^{2} in Taiwan. Neglecting weighting, 9 mJ/cm^{2} is 1 UV index hour.

== See also ==
- Fitzpatrick scale
- Health effects of sunlight exposure
- Solmáforo
- Sun protective clothing
- Sunscreen
