= C24H40N5O8 =

The molecular formula C_{24}H_{40}N_{5}O_{8} (molar mass: 526.603 g/mol, exact mass: 526.2877 u) may refer to:

- Desmosine
- Isodesmosine
