= Kyrle disease =

- Other names: Hyperkeratosis follicularis et parafollicularis in cutem penetrans
- Specialty: Dermatology

Kyrle disease is identified as a form of an acquired perforating disease. Other major perforating diseases are elastosis perforans serpiginosa and reactive perforating collagenosis. Recently, however, there is a controversy on categorizing Kyrle disease with perforating dermatosis or a subtype of acquired perforating collagenosis.

Kyrle disease was first described by Josef Kyrle in 1916 when a diabetic woman presented generalized hyperkeratotic nodules. The disease is distinguished by large papules with central keratin plug on the skin, usually on the legs of the patient and is often in conjunction with liver, kidney or diabetic disorders. It can affect both females and males with a 6:1 ratio. The papules usually show up on the patient with an average age of 30 years. Kyrle disease is a rare disease unless there is a high count of patients with chronic kidney failure. The disease seems to be more prevalent in African Americans, which can be correlated to the high incidence of diabetes mellitus and kidney failure in the population.

== Signs and symptoms ==
Kyrle disease symptoms are chronic and have an onset during adulthood between the ages of 30 and 50 years of age. However, there were reported cases of early onset as early as 5 years of age and late onset as late as 75 years of age. The main symptom is the development of small papules into painless lesions that are surrounded by silvery scales. The lesions are painless, however, there is a chance that the patient may experience extreme urges to itch them. In time, these lesions grow up to a radius of 0.75 inch and develop into red-brown nodules with a central plug of keratin. As more lesions develop, they can come together and form larger keratotic plaques. These lesions are usually observed on the lower extremities, however, can also develop on the upper extremities, such as, the arms, the head and the neck. The only parts of the body that Kyrle disease do not form are the palms, soles, and mucous membranes. Lesions may heal spontaneously without treatment, however, new ones will develop in its place.

Other symptoms that may be observed:

- Hyperkeratotic cone-shaped papular plugs
- Hyperkeratotic verrucous plaques
- Diabetes mellitus
- Hepatic insufficiency
- Presence of albumin in the urine
- Excess sugar in the urine

== Causes ==
The causes of Kyrle disease are unclear and can be idiopathic. The only correlation that has shown light is the frequent association with an underlying disorder, such as, diabetes mellitus, chronic kidney disease, hyperlipoproteinemia, liver abnormalities, and congestive heart failure. However, there had been cases where Kyrle disease was seen without any conjunction with the previous mentioned disorders. Due to the causes of Kyrle disease is unknown, the best way to prevent the disease is to prevent the disorders that are usually reported in conjunction with it.

== Mechanism ==
The pathophysiology of Kyrle disease is unclear. Some scientists believe that it may be a variation of prurigo nodularis. The theory that most scientists agree upon is that Kyrle disease is an elimination of keratin and other cellular material across the epidermis. Keratinization in Kyrle disease form at the basilar layer that is lower than the normal proliferation region in the epidermis. This causes an inflammatory response which results with the keratin, along with other cellular material and connective tissue, to be forced out the epidermis. Another reason for an inflammatory response may be due to an alteration of the dermal connective tissue. This is theorized because this step is a main reason for inflammatory responses in other skin diseases, such as, elastosis perforans serpiginosa and perforating collagenosis.

== Diagnosis ==
Since many other skin disorders can be characterized by abnormal papules or nodules, a dermatologist will determine if a patient has Kyrle disease by the depth of penetrating keratotic plugs, localized distribution of the plugs, size of plugs, and the age of onset. A physician will also have to test for disorders, such as, diabetes, hepatic, and renal disease to help bolster the diagnosis of Kyrle disease. Other underlying diseases that Kyrle disease is observed with are tuberculosis, pulmonary aspergillosis, scabies, atopic dermatitis, AIDS, neurodermatitis, and endocrinological disorders.

The inheritance of Kyrle disease is unknown as reported cases point to both autosomal dominance and autosomal recessiveness.

== Treatment ==
The best treatment for Kyrle's disease is to treat the underlying disease if present as life expectancy is also determined by the underlying disease. However, if there are no other diseases associated with Kyrle disease, treatment of the lesions is the course of action. There is a chance of the lesions healing without treatment but new ones will develop.

=== Medical care ===
Isotretinoin, high doses of vitamin A and tretinoin cream can be utilized. Also, emollients, oral antihistamines, and antipruritic creams that contain menthol and camphor may be helpful because the lesions can become very itchy.

=== Radiation therapy ===
UV irradiation can be utilized after curetting the hyperkeratosis with a combination medication treatment of oral retinoids, psoralen and Ultraviolet A radiation.

=== Surgical care ===
Surgical options are considered the final option for treating Kyrle disease. The use of a carbon dioxide laser, electrocautery, or cryosurgery to rid of limited lesions can be implemented. Patients with darker skin must take extra precaution as these options can lead to dyspigmentation. In addition, performing on patients that had Kyrle disease due to diabetes mellitus or have poor circulation can lead to poor healing.

== Prognosis ==
Morbidity and mortality range from both extremes as the significance correlate with the underlying systemic disease.

== Recent research ==
There seems to be beneficial responses to clindamycin therapy as the lesions regress. This leads to the hypothesis that microorganisms may be playing a role in the initial stages of Kyrle disease.

A family with Kyrle disease were examined which their skin lesions were benign. However, when three of the young adult members were closely examined, they had posterior subcapsular cataracts and two of those three developed multiple tiny yellow-brown anterior stromal corneal opacities. In order to determine if there is any correlation between Kyrle disease and the ocular observations, more cases of Kyrle disease are to be analyzed.

All in all, since Kyrle disease is relatively rare, more cases need to be studied and analyzed in order to understand the underlying pathogenesis and to improve the management of the disease.
