= Jalili syndrome =

- Other names: Cone rod dystrophy-amelogenesis imperfecta syndrome
- Jalili syndrome is inherited via an autosomal recessive manner

Jalili syndrome is a genetic disorder characterized by the combination of cone-rod dystrophy of the retina and amelogenesis imperfecta. It was characterized in 1988 by Dr. I. K. Jalili and Dr. N. J. D. Smith, following the examination of 29 members of an inbred Arab family living within the Gaza Strip.

== Presentation ==
Affected individuals commonly suffer from photophobia, nystagmus and achromatopsia. Other symptoms affecting vision may include night vision difficulties; optic disc pallor; narrow vessels; macular atrophy with pigment mottling; peripheral deep white dot deposits or retinal pigment epithelium (RPE) alterations in the inferonasal retina; decreased foveal and retinal thickness; attenuation of retinal lamination; hyperreflectivity in the choroids (due to RPE and choriocapillaris atrophy); impairment of color vision; and progressive loss of vision with advancing age.

In line with ameleogenesis imperfecta, affected members may display teeth yellow-brown in colour, dysplastic, presenting numerous caries; reduced enamel layer prone to post-eruptive failure; and abnormality of morphology involving dentine.

== Genetics ==
The Jalili syndrome is caused by different mutations all with a linkage at the achromatopsia locus 2q11 on the metal transporter gene, CNNM4. Sequence analysis of this gene within Jalili syndrome sufferers has identified homozygosity or compound heterozygosity for several different mutations in the CNNM4 gene.

== Epidemiology ==
The distribution of Jalili syndrome sufferers is varied. Instances, beyond the Gaza strip patients who characterized the syndrome, include a two generation family from Kosovo who presented in the first few years of life with autosomal recessive cone-rod dystrophy and the hypoplastic/hypomineralized variant of amelogenesis imperfecta, a sister and brother from Kosovo who presented at ages 14 and 7 respectively with dysplastic and discoloured decidual and permanent teeth, and a five generation Lebanese family with two sisters and a male cousin presenting ocular and dental phenotypes akin to the Kosovan siblings.

In 2009, new examinations of the original Palestinian and Kosovan families reported by Jalili and Smith in 1988 and Michaelides et al. in 2004, led to the discovery of five additional cases displayed across genetically unconnected families from varying ethnicities, leading to the proposal of the term "Jalili syndrome" by Parry et al. A small cluster of eight individuals has been documented among the Amish in rural west-central Wisconsin.
