= Cutaneous perforating disorders =

- Specialty: Dermatology

Cutaneous perforating disorders include the following:

- Acquired perforating dermatosis (Acquired perforating collagenosis)
- Kyrle disease
- Perforating folliculitis

== Signs and symptoms ==
Acquired perforating dermatosis can present with a variety of polymorphous skin lesions, including hyperkeratotic, frequently umbilicated, millimetric or larger papules or nodules.

The usual presentation of Kyrle disease consists of nodules and hyperkeratotic papules with a central keratotic plug. The lower extremities—particularly the calf, tibial region, and posterior aspect—are the most frequently affected by skin lesions. Additionally, the arms, head, and neck regions may be affected.

Papules in perforating folliculitis are usually localized to areas of the extremities (arms, thighs, and buttocks) that bear hair. Lesions are often asymptomatic, though pruritus is a notable characteristic, particularly in those with impaired kidney function. Lesions can last for months or years, waxing and waning.

== Causes ==
Although the precise cause of acquired perforating dermatosis is unknown, certain cases seem to have a genetic tendency.

It's unclear exactly what causes Kyrle disease. Numerous explanations, such as infection, aberrant keratinization, impaired differentiation of the epidermis and dermo-epidermal junction, increased fibronectin concentrations in tissue and serum, uremia (renal failure), and hyperphosphatemia (diabetes mellitus), have been put forth in the literature.

Even though there have been some documented occurrences of idiopathic perforating folliculitis, certain correlations have also been noted. The more common relationship with chronic renal failure suggests a pathogenetic link, even though some associations may just be coincidental. Additionally, perforating folliculitis and diabetes mellitus are rather frequently reported together.

== Diagnosis ==
The patient's medical history, the lesions' clinical appearance, and—most importantly—histopathology with the identification of typical histological characteristics are all important in the diagnosis of acquired perforating dermatosis.

The diagnosis of Kyrle disease is made on the basis of distinctive histologic and clinical features.

== Treatment ==
There are no guidelines or controlled trials available for the management of acquired perforating dermatosis. The control of underlying diseases and the relief of pruritus need to be the main objectives of treatment.

There aren't any well-designed randomized control trials looking into Kyrle disease therapy options as of yet. Currently, tiny case series or anecdotal reports serve as the basis for treatment recommendations. Salicylic acid and urea, two keratolytics, are regarded as first-line treatments. To treat pruritus, emollients and oral antihistamines have been utilized.

== See also ==
- List of cutaneous conditions
