= Elaunin =

Elaunin (Greek verb ἐλαύνω "I steer") is a component of elastic fibers formed from deposition of elastin between oxytalan fibers. It is found in the periodontal ligament and the connective tissue of the dermis, particularly in association with sweat glands.

== Structure ==
Three distinct fiber types have been identified within the dermis: oxytalan, elaunin, and elastic fibers. The most superficial of these, the oxytalan fibers, are extremely slender and oriented perpendicularly to the dermoepidermal junction. They arise from a plexus exhibiting the staining properties of elaunin fibers, which in turn are contiguous with the thicker elastic fibers of the reticular dermis. Electron microscopy shows that oxytalan fibers consist of bundles of tubular microfibrils measuring approximately 10–12 nm in diameter. In deeper dermal layers, these bundles contain a central amorphous substance. Elaunin fibers contain only small amounts of this amorphous material, whereas in elastic fibers it is abundant and densely compacted. The structure of Elaunin fibers allows for repeated stretching or pressure because they are made up of microfibrils and small amounts of elastic fibers (Sawada et al, 2006.) These elaunin fibers have moderate tissue elasticity and plays an important role by allowing tissues such as skin and mucosa to stretch during everyday movements without becoming permanently damaged. Additionally, the fibers support blood vessels by maintaining the shape of vessel lumen, especially during sudden or repeated changes in pressure. The flexibility of elaunin fibers allows for a certain level of stretch that is still strong enough to support moving tissues but does not recoil like fully developed elastic fibers do.

== Function ==
Elaunin fibers in the periodontal ligament (PDL) have connective tissue that anchors each tooth to the surrounding bone and helps cushion the forces generated while chewing. In studies on rat molars, researchers found that elaunin fibers appear alongside oxytalan and mature elastic fibers. It forms a flexible network that allows the PDL to stretch during function and then return to its original shape.

== Clinical significance ==
=== Aging ===
The Elaunin fibers and other parts of the elastic system undergo changes as tissues age. The elaunin fibers slowly start to lose strength and flexibility which normally helps keep our tissues resilient. By the time a person reaches middle age, the fibers show signs of breaking down; this is part of the normal aging process, even for individuals who protect their skin from sun exposure. In sun-exposed skin, the elaunin fibers are affected more, which causes deterioration to occur faster and the fibers to weaken more intensely. Over time sun-exposed skin starts turning into thick, irregular bundles compared to what would be seen in healthy tissue.

== Research ==
Elaunin fibers have been found within the secretory coil of human eccrine sweat glands. They were found in bundles of microtubules which had a different constancy than elastic fibers. The elaunin fibers found in the secretory coil had a less thick appearance than that of elastic fibers. Elaunin can be identified where the fibers of the gingival ligament are. There are elastic fibers, and one of the main types of elastic fibers is elaunin. In the papillary dermis, elaunin is lost when in reduction.

Proteins such as Fibulin-5 keep elastic fibers organized and functional. Fibulin-5 levels can drop due to normal aging or damage caused by UV exposure, this makes the elastic fibers start to lose its structure. They contribute to maintaining elasticity but are also sensitive to environmental stress and the natural aging process.

=== Role in periodontal tissues ===
Elaunin fibers in the periodontal ligament (PDL) have connective tissue that anchors each tooth to the surrounding bone and helps cushion the forces we generate while chewing. In studies on rat molars, researchers found that elaunin fibers appear alongside oxytalan and mature elastic fibers. It forms a flexible network that allows the PDL to stretch during function and then return to its original shape (Sawada et al., 2006).

== See also ==
- Elastic fibre
