= Acquired perforating dermatosis =

- Other names: Acquired perforating collagenosis
- Specialty: Dermatology

Acquired perforating dermatosis is clinically and histopathologically similar to perforating folliculitis, also associated with chronic kidney failure, with or without hemodialysis or peritoneal dialysis, and/or diabetes mellitus, but not identical to Kyrle disease.

== Signs and symptoms ==
On the hair-bearing limbs of adults, acquired perforating dermatosis typically manifests as extremely itchy follicular hyperkeratotic papules, which can occasionally become umbilicated. There may also be widespread papules.

== Causes ==
It is common for acquired perforating dermatosis to be linked to either renal failure, diabetes mellitus, or both. Ten percent or so of dialysis patients develop acquired perforating dermatosis. Additionally, it is sporadically linked to HIV, malignancy, hypothyroidism, and liver disease.

== Diagnosis ==
The patient's medical history, the lesions' clinical appearance, and, most importantly, histopathology with the identification of typical histological characteristics are all important in the diagnosis of acquired perforating dermatosis. Bright white clouds and structureless grey areas are visible on dermatoscopy during acquired perforating dermatosis, and these features may help differentiate the condition from prurigo nodularis.

== Treatment ==
Since koebnerization can aggravate perforating disorders, treatment may focus on reducing pruritus. The majority of treatment approaches, such as topical or intralesional corticosteroids and oral or topical retinoids, are backed by anecdotal evidence. For pruritus, phototherapy (broad-band or narrow-band UVB, or psoralen plus UVA) may be beneficial. Other strategies include destructive techniques like cryotherapy, laser therapy, and surgical debridement, as well as the use of antibiotics like doxycycline.

== See also ==
- Cutaneous perforating disorders
- Diabetic dermadrome
