= Anetoderma =

- Other names: Anetoderma maculosa, Anetoderma maculosa cutis, Atrophia maculosa cutis, and Macular atrophy.
- Specialty: Dermatology

Anetoderma is a benign but uncommon disorder that causes localized areas of flaccid or herniated sac-like skin due to a focal reduction of dermal elastic tissue. Anetoderma is subclassified as primary anetoderma, secondary anetoderma, iatrogenic anetoderma of prematurity, congenital anetoderma, familial anetoderma, and drug-induced anetoderma.

Two forms of primary anetoderma have been identified, based on whether an inflammatory response took place prior to the atrophy's appearance, anetoderma of Jadassohn-Pellizzari, in which inflammation occurs before the atrophic lesions appear, and anetoderma of Schweninger-Buzzi, in which inflammation is not present.

== Signs and symptoms ==
Typically pink macules that are round or oval and have a diameter of 0.5 to 1 centimeters grow on the trunk, thighs, and upper arms. They are less frequently found on the neck, face, and other areas. Usually, the soles, palms, and scalp are unaffected. Every macule grows for one or two weeks until it reaches a size of 2-3 centimeters. Larger erythematous plaques can occasionally be seen, and nodules have also been identified as the main lesion.

Lesions range widely in number from fewer than five to one hundred or more. The lesions do not change throughout a person's life, and new lesions frequently take years to appear. When the lesions combine, they create sizable atrophic regions that are identical to acquired cutis laxa. They could unite to encircle sizable regions, particularly along the neck and at the base of the limbs.

== Causes ==
Primary anetoderma is an idiopathic development of atrophic lesions in skin areas that appeared normal prior to the onset of atrophy.

Secondary anetoderma is a skin disease that develops in areas where there has previously been or is currently skin pathology. It has been linked to a variety of conditions, such as acne, urticaria pigmentosa, syphilis, leprosy, granuloma annulare, insect bites, and antiphospholipid syndrome. Secondary anetoderma has been linked to infectious, inflammatory, and tumorous conditions.

Macular depressions or skin outpouchings linked to the loss of dermal elastic tissue that are observed in premature infants are referred to as anetoderma of prematurity. According to reports, the location of monitoring electrodes or leads, such as ECG electrodes, may be related to these cutaneous lesions.

Case reports have described instances of congenital anetoderma presenting as anetoderma on the trunk of premature infants at birth.

Penicillamine administration has been linked to drug-induced anetoderma, especially in Wilson disease patients.

Familial anetoderma is rare and is inherited autosomally. The familial form usually appears in the first ten years of life and may show up only as skin manifestations, but it can also be linked to ocular, neurological, and bony abnormalities.

== Diagnosis ==
Anetoderma can be diagnosed clinically. But if the diagnosis proves to be difficult, a skin biopsy—ideally a punch biopsy—can be carried out to include the mid dermis. Under a microscope, the epidermis of anetoderma exhibits a nearly total loss of elastic fibers in the reticular and papillary dermal layers. A dermal periadnexal and perivascular infiltrate containing histiocytes and plasma cells can also be seen in the histopathology of the lesion.

In lesional skin, elastophagocytosis and tiny fragmented elastic fibrils can be seen in addition to the histopathology on electron microscopy. Desmosine has been used to quantify the amount of elastin in lesional skin, which is considerably lower in anetoderma, since it is a major amino acid in elastin.

=== Classification ===
There are five subtypes of anetoderma: drug-induced anetoderma, familial anetoderma, prematurity-associated anetoderma, primary (idiopathic) anetoderma, and secondary anetoderma from a previous dermatosis. The Jadassohn-Pellizzari type and the Schweninger-Buzzi type are the historical subtypes of the primary type, which is found in areas of previously normal skin. While the Schweninger-Buzzi type of anetoderma develops in skin that appears normal with no predisposition skin changes, the Jadassohn-Pellizzari type occurs following the occurrence of inflammatory or urticarial lesions. These terms are now obsolete because the two primary types are identical histologically as well as having a similar disease course.

== See also ==
- List of cutaneous conditions
- Atrophoderma
