= GM1 gangliosidoses =

- Other names: GM1 gangliosidosis
- Specialty: Endocrinology

The GM1 gangliosidoses, usually shortened to GM1, are gangliosidoses caused by mutation in the GLB1 gene resulting in a deficiency of beta-galactosidase. The deficiency causes abnormal storage of acidic lipid materials in cells of the central and peripheral nervous systems, but particularly in the nerve cells, resulting in progressive neurodegeneration. GM1 is a rare lysosomal storage disorder with a prevalence of 1 to every 100,000 to 200,000 live births worldwide, although rates are higher in some regions.

== Cause ==
GM1 Gangliosidoses disorders are caused by mutations in the GLB1 gene, which codes for lysosomal hydrolase, acid beta-galactosidase (β-gal). Low levels of β-gal cause an accumulation of GM1 gangliosides. They are inherited, autosomal recessive sphingolipidoses, a class of lipid storage disorders.

== Diagnosis ==
Diagnosis of GM1 can be obtained by genetic and enzymatic testing.

=== Types ===
GM1 has three forms classified by age of onset.

- Type 1: early infantile
- Type 2: late infantile/juvenile
- Type 3: adult

==== Early infantile GM1 ====
Symptoms of early infantile GM1 (the most severe subtype, with onset shortly after birth) may include neurodegeneration, seizures, liver enlargement (hepatomegaly), spleen enlargement (splenomegaly), coarsening of facial features, skeletal irregularities, joint stiffness, distended abdomen, muscle weakness, exaggerated startle response to sound, and problems with gait.

About half of affected patients develop cherry-red spots in the eye.

Children may be deaf and blind by age 1 and often die by age 3 from cardiac complications or pneumonia.

- Early psychomotor deterioration: decreased activity and lethargy in the first weeks; never sit; feeding problems - failure to thrive; visual failure (nystagmus noted) by 6 months; initial hypotonia; later spasticity with pyramidal signs; secondary microcephaly develops; decerebrate rigidity by 1 year and death by age 1–2 years (due to pneumonia and respiratory failure); some have hyperacusis.
- Macular cherry-red spots in 50% by 6–10 months; corneal opacities in some
- Facial dysmorphology: frontal bossing, wide nasal bridge, facial edema (puffy eyelids); peripheral edema, epicanthus, long upper lip, microretrognathia, gingival hypertrophy (thick alveolar ridges), macroglossia
- Hepatomegaly by 6 months and splenomegaly later; some have cardiac failure
- Skeletal deformities: flexion contractures noted by 3 months; early subperiosteal bone formation (may be present at birth); diaphyseal widening later; demineralization; thoracolumbar vertebral hypoplasia and beaking at age 3–6 months; kyphoscoliosis. *Dysostosis multiplex (as in the mucopolysaccharidoses)
- 10–80% of peripheral lymphocytes are vacuolated; foamy histiocytes in bone marrow; visceral mucopolysaccharide storage similar to that in Hurler disease; GM1 storage in cerebral gray matter is 10-fold elevated (20–50-fold increased in viscera)
- Galactose-containing oligosacchariduria and moderate keratan sulfaturia
- Morquio disease Type B: Mutations with higher residual beta-galactosidase activity for the GM1 substrate than for keratan sulfate and other galactose-containing oligosaccharides have minimal neurologic involvement but severe dysostosis resembling Morquio disease type A (Mucopolysaccharidosis type 4).

==== Late infantile/Juvenile GM1 ====
Onset of late infantile GM1 is typically between ages 1 and 3 years. The juvenile form may be diagnosed into childhood. Some children live into adolescence or early adulthood. This subtype is characterized by a trajectory in which some developmental skills are gained, then they stabilize and delays occur, and these are followed by regression. Early symptoms include difficulty crawling and walking, hypotonia, speech and swallowing problems, and seizures. Neurological symptoms include ataxia, seizures, dementia, and difficulties with speech.

==== Adult GM1 ====
Onset of adult GM1 is typically in adolescence or adulthood and is the slowest progressing of the subtypes.

Symptoms include muscle atrophy, neurological complications that are less severe and progress at a slower rate than in other forms of the disorder, corneal clouding in some patients, and dystonia (sustained muscle contractions that cause twisting and repetitive movements or abnormal postures). Angiokeratomas may develop on the lower part of the trunk of the body. Most patients have a normal size liver and spleen. Prenatal diagnosis is possible by measurement of Acid Beta Galactosidase in cultured amniotic cells.

== Treatment ==
Treatment for GM1 is symptom-based and palliative. There is no cure for GM1, although several gene therapy trials are underway. More information for these can be found at ClinicalTrials.gov.
