= Perforating folliculitis =

- Specialty: Dermatology

Perforating folliculitis is a skin condition in humans characterized by discrete follicular keratotic eruptions involving mainly the hairy parts of the extremities.

== Signs and symptoms ==
Papules in perforating folliculitis are usually localized to areas of the extremities that bear hair. Lesions are often asymptomatic, though pruritus is a notable characteristic, particularly in those with impaired kidney function. Lesions can last for months or years, waxing and waning.

Primary lesions of perforating folliculitis typically have scaly, folliculocentric papules that are 2 to 8 mm in diameter, tiny central keratotic plugs, and various degrees of erythema.

== Causes ==
Even though there have been some documented occurrences of idiopathic perforating folliculitis, certain correlations have also been noted. The more prevalent relationship with chronic renal failure suggests a pathogenetic link, while some associations may just be coincidental. Additionally, perforating folliculitis and diabetes mellitus are rather frequently reported together.

== Diagnosis ==
In cases of perforating folliculitis, the affected hair follicle has a transepithelial channel and, frequently, a parakeratotic luminal plug as well as focal destruction of its lateral wall. In this transfollicular channel and in the follicular lumen, parakeratotic keratin is combined with connective-tissue components, such as collagen and elastin, and a variety of inflammatory cells. A hair shaft or hair fragment may occasionally be seen inside the transfollicular channel, the follicular lumen, or both. Usually, there is localized fibrosis and scant inflammation in the dermis around the follicle.

== Treatment ==
Tretinoin 0.1% cream can be used to treat perforating folliculitis.

== See also ==
- Cutaneous perforating disorders
- List of cutaneous conditions
