= Reactive perforating collagenosis =

- Specialty: Dermatology

Reactive perforating collagenosis is a rare, familial, nonpuritic skin disorder characterized by papules that grow in a diameter of 4 to 6mm and develop a central area of umbilication to which keratinous material is lodged. The cause of reactive perforating collagenosis is unknown.

== Clinical Features ==
=== Inherited form ===
Keratotic papules measuring 1 to 6 mm develop on the extensor surface of the hands, the elbows, and the knees following superficial trauma. These lesions are painless. They appear as pin-sized lesions that grow to a papule of about 6mm in the following 3–5 weeks. They undergo spontaneous resolution in about 6–8 weeks leaving residual scarring. Lesions may recur throughout life. Cold weather is one of the factors known to trigger recurrences.

=== Acquired form ===
In this form, keratotic papules develop on the trunk and extremities. These are commonly associated with pruritus. Lesions may or may not be related to superficial trauma.

== See also ==
- Elastosis perforans serpiginosa
- List of cutaneous conditions
