= Oxytalan =

Oxytalan fibers are elastic-like fibers that run parallel to the tooth surface and bend to attach to cementum. Fibrillin builds the oxytalan fibers, which causes the elastic behavior.

In the cellular anatomy of teeth, oxytalan fibres are a component of the extracellular matrix. They were first described by Fullmer & Lillie (1958) in periodontal membranes. On light microscope examination, these fibres may be distinguished from mature elastic fibers by their failure to stain with aldehyde fuchsin solutions, unless they have been oxidized by potassium permanganate, performic acid or peracetic acid.

Under electron microscopy they appear to be composed of microfibrillar units, 7–20 nm in diameter with a periodicity of 12–17 nm.

From their morphology, localization and staining properties it seems likely that these fibers are an immature form of elastic tissue.

They can be found on the surface of smooth muscles. They are largely associated with blood vessels.

== Characteristics ==
The fibers' resistance to formic acid breakdown gave rise to the term "oxytalan". Elaunin, oxytalan, and elastic are the three different forms of elastic fibers. The thinnest, or oxytalan fibers, are perpendicular to the dermoepidermal junction and are the most superficial. In this work, electron microscopy was used to study these oxytalan fibers of human skin. They noticed that they appear to be related to bundles of fibers in a parallel pattern. 10 to 12 nm is the diameter of each. The elastic system's function in maintaining the architecture of the skin, especially at the dermoepidermal junction, is another important element to take into account. The acknowledgement of the existence of the adhesion between the basement lamina and the oxytalan fibers that Kobayasi described is supported by their observations. The fact that these structures resemble the fibrillar component of elastic fibers must be emphasized.

The oxytalan system's histological appearance is distinguished by fiber ramifications and anastomoses.

The periodontal membranes of all human teeth, as well as those of monkeys, rats, guinea pigs, and mice, contain oxytalan fibers.

It is also mentioned that a portion of oxytalan fibers support the lymphatic and blood vessels that lead to the teeth .In periodontal membranes of teeth under higher stress, as those used as bridge abutments, there is an increase in both the quantity and size of oxytalan fibers.

== Relations ==
Certain established facts indicate that oxytalan fibers and elastic fibers are related. These include the fact that oxytalan fibers are found in specially modified connective tissue structures like periodontal ligament, PDL, and that they are stained with three of the five elastic tissue stains if they are pre-oxidized with peracetic acid. Additionally, they are more easily digested by commercially prepared elastase than collagen.

Previous research has shown that the steer, pig, sheep, and deer have higher proportions of elastic to Oxytalan fibers than the other animals under investigation.

The reaction of the periodontal ligament (PDL) to orthodontic and functional stresses is largely dependent on its biomechanical makeup. However, a number of studies suggest that oxytalan fibers—a subset of elastic fibers—also have a role in the PDL's biomechanical properties and behavior. Excessive dilatation of PDL capillaries has been reported in mgR mice, a type that exhibits significantly lower expression of FBN-1, according to one study. Blood vessel and oxytalan fiber formation occurring at the same time lends additional evidence to a functional link.

Oxytalan has been proposed to have a number of roles, including vascular system support and maintenance, vascular flow modulation, cell migration guidance, and a role in the mechanical characteristics of the periodontal ligament.

The observation of a close relationship between oxytalan fibers and blood vessels inside the PDL provides support for the theory that the oxytalan fiber network is in charge of maintaining and supporting the vascular system. These are hypothetical functions; none of them are supported by research, but they can all be investigated.

Rannie (1963) employed a monopersulfate compound, oxone, with more recent work yielding more satisfying technical results. The easiest way to observe the fibers after the oxidation stage is to stain them with Gomori's aldehyde fuchsin; after preoxidation, some fibers will show up with orcein and resorcin fuchsin.(3,9) The oxytalan fiber is not visible when stained with either Verhoeffs ferric chloride hemtoxylin or Orcinol-new fuchsin following oxidation. Studies on histochemistry and morphology at light microscopy magnifications offer some support for theories about a possible relationship to elastic fibers. They also suggest that the oxytalan fiber belongs in the same category as elastic fibers and that it has multiple structural components.

== Chronic periodontitis ==
Research indicates a close association between the condition, oxytalan fibers, and chronic periodontitis. The pathological alterations associated with chronic periodontitis included edema and a noticeable infiltration of inflammatory plasma cells in the periodontal tissue. The oxytalan fibers were disrupted or completely absent in the areas closest to the basement membrane. The oxytalan fibers surrounding blood arteries were also largely damaged. Three methods—light microscopy(LM), transmission electron microscopy (TEM), and scanning electron microscopy—were employed in this investigation to examine oxytalan fibers.

The oxytalan fibers were observed under an electron microscope to be loose, endless, and composed of extremely fine fibrils, with an 11–12 nm diameter.

The oxytalan fibers were broken down by TEM, shattered in the interstitial tissue and detached from the basal lamina.

Large volumes of long, branching, smooth-surfaced interlaced oxytalan fiber meshwork were visible in the SEM.

Additionally, it is noted that because oxytalan fibers are made up of bundles of microfibrils without elastin, they are unable to elongate in response to mechanical stress.

The biological role and significance of oxytalan are not fully understood, despite research. Their characteristics have been studied using light microscopy, transmission electron microscopy, and scanning electron microscopy.
