= Linear focal elastosis =

- Other names: Linear focal dermal elastosis, Elastotic striae
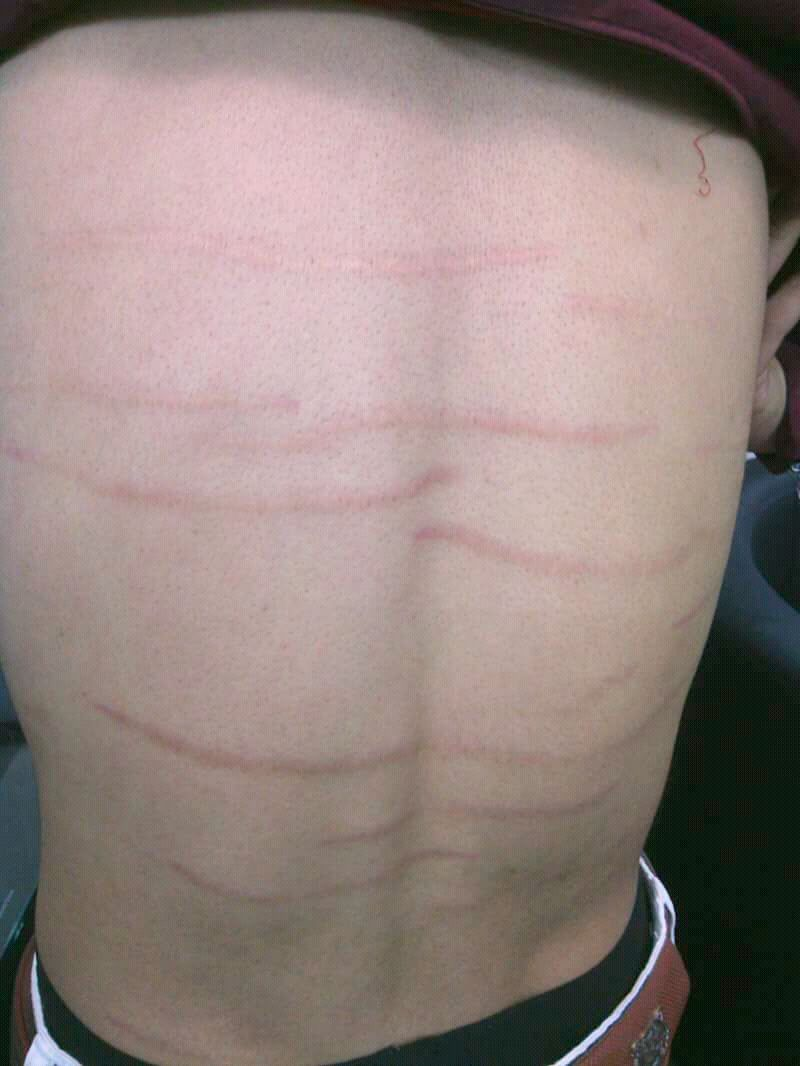
- Specialty: Dermatology

Linear focal elastosis or elastotic striae is a skin condition that presents with asymptomatic, palpable or atrophic, yellow lines of the middle and lower back, thighs, arms and breasts.

== Signs and symptoms ==
Linear focal elastosis manifests as hypertrophic linear yellow to red plaques that are asymptomatic and typically discovered by accident in the absence of a traumatic past. Though it usually affects the lower and middle back symmetrically, it can also affect the legs or face.

== Causes ==
Although the exact origin of linear focal elastosis is unknown, changes to elastic tissues are implicated.

== Diagnosis ==
According to histopathology, there may be more localized wavy fibers in the dermis, which are visible when elastic staining separates normal from hypertrophic collagen bundles. There may be fragmentation or aggregation of the elastic fibers in the deep and upper dermis. Fragmented elastic tissue, microfibrillar or granular constituents, and aggregated elastin are visible under an electron microscope.

== Gallery ==
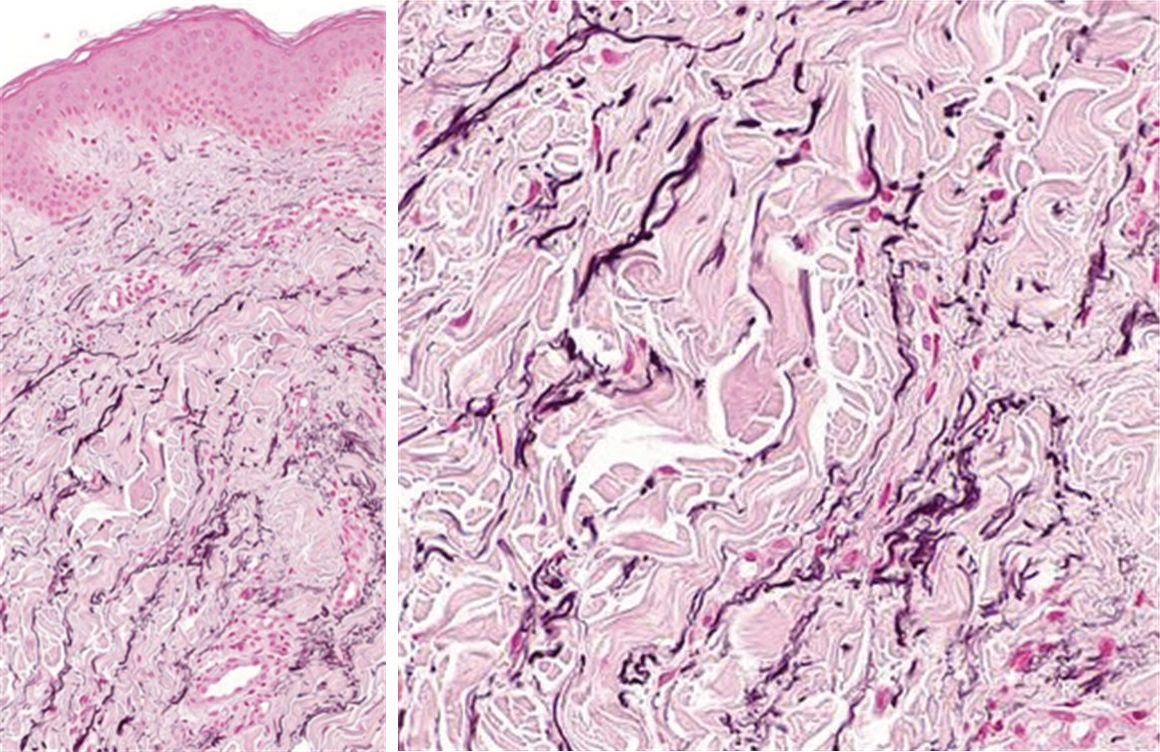
Histopathology: Accumulation of fragmented elastotic material within the papillary dermis and transcutaneous elimination of elastotic fibers.

== See also ==
- Skin lesion
