= GLB1 =

Protein

Identifiers
- Aliases: GLB1, EBP, ELNR1, MPS4B, galactosidase beta 1
- External IDs: OMIM: 611458; MGI: 88151; GeneCards: GLB1
Available structures
PDB	Ortholog search: PDBe RCSB
PDB	List of PDB id codes 3THC, 3THD, 3WEZ, 3WF0, 3WF1, 3WF2, 3WF3, 3WF4
Enzyme activity
EC #	BRENDA	ExPASy	KEGG	MetaCyc
3.2.1.23	↗	↗	↗	↗

Gene location (Human)
Chr.	Chromosome 3 (human)
Band	3p22.3	Start	32,996,609 bp
Band	3p22.3	End	33,097,202 bp

Gene location (Mouse)
Chr.	Chromosome 9 (mouse)
Band	9 F3|9 64.4 cM	Start	114,230,144 bp
Band	9 F3|9 64.4 cM	End	114,303,966 bp
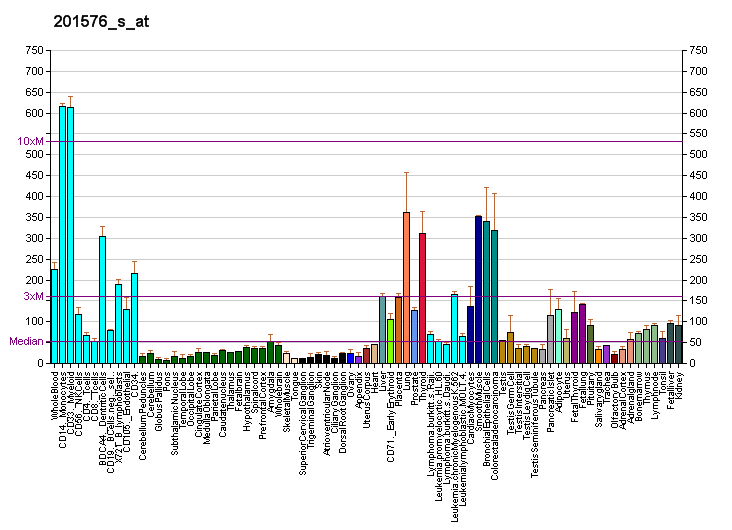
RNA expression pattern
Bgee	Human / Mouse (ortholog); Top expressed in: monocyte; stromal cell of endometrium; secondary oocyte; islet of Langerhans; corpus epididymis; granulocyte; rectum; epithelium of colon; gallbladder; tibia / Top expressed in: right kidney; human kidney; proximal tubule; migratory enteric neural crest cell; seminal vesicula; epithelium of small intestine; blastocyst; stroma of bone marrow; calvaria; yolk sac; More reference expression data
BioGPS	More reference expression data
Gene ontology
Molecular function	protein binding; hydrolase activity, hydrolyzing O-glycosyl compounds; galactoside binding; hydrolase activity, acting on glycosyl bonds; hydrolase activity; exo-alpha-sialidase activity; beta-galactosidase activity; protein homodimerization activity
Cellular component	perinuclear region of cytoplasm; Golgi apparatus; lysosome; lysosomal lumen; intracellular membrane-bounded organelle; extracellular exosome; cytoplasm; vacuole; extracellular region; extracellular space; azurophil granule lumen; ficolin-1-rich granule lumen
Biological process	galactose catabolic process; glycosphingolipid metabolic process; cellular carbohydrate metabolic process; keratan sulfate catabolic process; metabolism; glycosaminoglycan catabolic process; neutrophil degranulation; response to cortisone; response to Thyroglobulin triiodothyronine; carbohydrate metabolic process
Sources:Amigo / QuickGO
Orthologs
Databases	NCBI: entry; OMA: entry
Species	Human	Mouse
Entrez	2720	12091
Ensembl	ENSG00000170266	ENSMUSG00000045594
UniProt	P16278	P23780
RefSeq (mRNA)	NM_001135602; NM_000404; NM_001079811; NM_001317040; NM_001393580	NM_009752
RefSeq (protein)	NP_000395; NP_001073279; NP_001129074; NP_001303969	NP_033882
Location (UCSC)	Chr 3: 33 – 33.1 Mb	Chr 9: 114.23 – 114.3 Mb
PubMed search
- Wikidata
View/Edit Human	View/Edit Mouse

Galactosidase, beta 1, also known as GLB1, is a protein which in humans is encoded by the GLB1 gene.

The GLB1 protein is a beta-galactosidase that cleaves the terminal beta-galactose from ganglioside substrates and other glycoconjugates. The GLB1 gene also encodes an elastin binding protein.

In corn (Zea mays), Glb1 is a gene coding for the storage protein globulin.

== Clinical significance ==
GM1-gangliosidosis is a lysosomal storage disease that can be caused by a deficiency of β-galactosidase (GLB1). Some cases of Morquio syndrome B have been shown to be due to GLP1 mutations that cause patients to have abnormal elastic fibers.

== Elastin receptor ==
The RNA transcript of the GLB1 gene is alternatively spliced and produces 2 mRNAs. The 2.5-kilobase transcript encodes the beta-galactosidase enzyme of 677 amino acids. The alternative 2.0-kb mRNA encodes a beta-galactosidase-related protein (S-Gal) that is only 546 amino acids long and that has no enzymatic activity. The S-Gal protein does bind elastin and fragments of elastin that are generated by proteolysis.

The S-Gal protein is a peripheral membrane protein that functions as part of an elastin receptor complex on the surface of cells. The elastin receptor complex includes S-Gal, neuraminidase and Cathepsin A. When elastin-derived peptides bind to the S-Gal protein then the associated neuraminidase enzyme activity is activated and responding cells can have altered signal transduction involving extracellular signal-regulated kinases and regulated matrix metallopeptidase production. Elastin-derived peptides are chemotactic for some cell types and can alter cell cycle progression. The ability of the GLB1-derived elastin binding protein and the elastin receptor complex to influence cell proliferation appears to be indirect and involve removal of sialic acid from extracellular and cell surface proteins such as growth factor receptors.

The S-Gal protein functions during the normal assembly of elastin into extracellular elastic fibers. Elastin is initially present as newly synthesized tropoelastin which can be found in association with S-Gal. The enzymatic activity of neuraminidase in the elastin receptor complex is involved in the release of tropoelastin molecules from the S-Gal chaperone. Cathepsin A is also required for normal elastin biosynthesis.
