= Solmáforo =

Machine measuring ultraviolet radiation

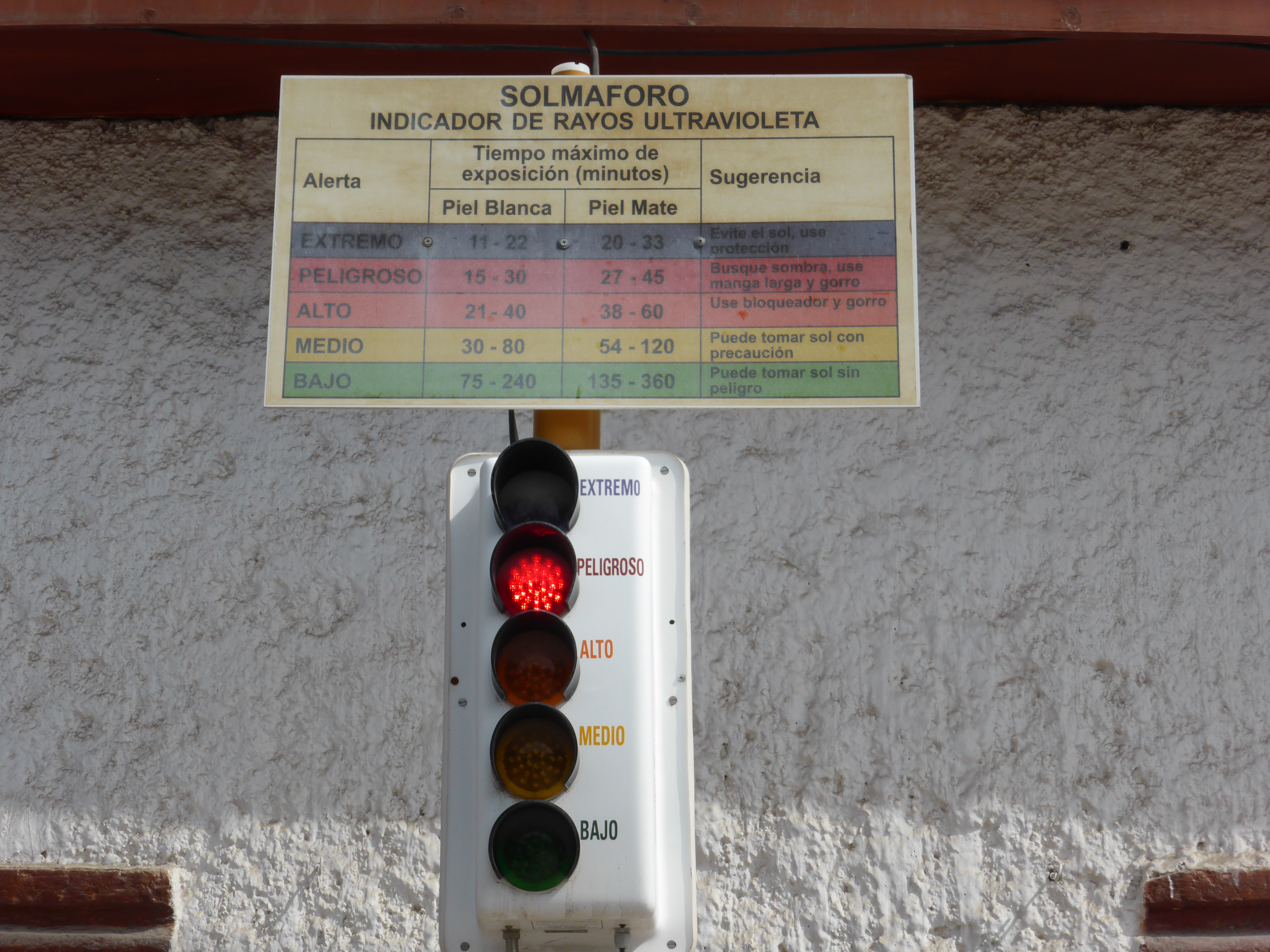
Solmáforo in Putre, northern Chile, indicating a red or dangerous level of ultraviolet radiation. The plaque above indicates safe exposure times for those with white or darker skin, and necessary precautions.

A solmáforo is a machine resembling a traffic light that measures levels of ultraviolet radiation and indicates it to the public with five coloured lights. The name combines the Spanish words sol (sun) and semáforo (traffic light).

== History ==
Ozone depletion over Antarctica has an effect on the ultraviolet radiation levels in Chile, particularly the south of the country. The National Cancer Corporation (CONAC) recorded an 8.3% increase in skin cancer in the decade up to 2005, with 25% of patients being under 50. From January 2001, CONAC and the Department of Physics of the University of Santiago worked on a campaign to track levels of dangerous UV-B light.

The solmáforo was invented in 2004 by Tomás Santibáñez and Ernesto Gramsch. They designed it to communicate to the general public, as previous measurements were by microwatts per square centimetre, which was complicated. Using five colours as established by the World Health Organization, it indicates if the UV level is low (green), moderate (yellow), high (orange), dangerous (red) or extreme (purple). It indicates the UV level in real time, while media reports often only mention the daily peak.

On 27 November 2004, the first solmáforo was installed in Coyhaique, in Patagonia. They have since been introduced in countries including Colombia, Mexico, Argentina, Peru and Spain.
