= Elastin =

Protein allowing tissue in the body to resume shape after stretching

ELN

Identifiers
- Aliases: ELN, SVAS, WBS, WS, elastin, ADCL1
- External IDs: OMIM: 130160; MGI: 95317; GeneCards: ELN

Gene location (Human)
| Chr. | Chromosome 7 (human) |
| Band | 7q11.23 | Start | 74,027,789 bp |
| Band | 7q11.23 | End | 74,069,907 bp |

Gene location (Mouse)
| Chr. | Chromosome 5 (mouse) |
| Band | 5 G2|5 74.76 cM | Start | 134,731,447 bp |
| Band | 5 G2|5 74.76 cM | End | 134,776,177 bp |
RNA expression pattern
| Bgee | Human / Mouse (ortholog); Top expressed in: Descending thoracic aorta; ascending aorta; right coronary artery; right lung; popliteal artery; tibial arteries; gastric mucosa; left coronary artery; right auricle of heart; upper lobe of left lung / Top expressed in: ascending aorta; aortic valve; left lung lobe; external carotid artery; tunica media of zone of aorta; internal carotid artery; optic nerve; umbilical cord; lactiferous gland; atrioventricular valve; More reference expression data |
| BioGPS | n/a |
Gene ontology
| Molecular function | extracellular matrix structural constituent; protein binding; extracellular matrix constituent conferring elasticity; extracellular matrix binding |
| Cellular component | extracellular region; elastic fiber; extracellular matrix; collagen-containing extracellular matrix |
| Biological process | animal organ morphogenesis; cell population proliferation; extracellular matrix disassembly; extracellular matrix organization; blood circulation; respiratory gaseous exchange by respiratory system; outflow tract morphogenesis; aortic valve morphogenesis; skeletal muscle tissue development; regulation of actin filament polymerization; stress fiber assembly; regulation of smooth muscle cell proliferation |
Sources:Amigo / QuickGO
Orthologs
| Databases | NCBI: entry; OMA: entry |
| Species | Human | Mouse |
| Entrez | 2006 | 13717 |
| Ensembl | ENSG00000049540 | ENSMUSG00000029675 |
| UniProt | P15502 | P54320 |
| RefSeq (mRNA) | NM_000501; NM_001081752; NM_001081753; NM_001081754; NM_001081755 NM_001278912; NM_001278913; NM_001278914; NM_001278915; NM_001278916; NM_001278917; NM_001278918; NM_001278939 | NM_007925 |
| RefSeq (protein) | NP_000492; NP_001075221; NP_001075222; NP_001075223; NP_001075224 NP_001265841; NP_001265842; NP_001265843; NP_001265844; NP_001265845; NP_001265846; NP_001265847; NP_001265868 | NP_031951 |
| Location (UCSC) | Chr 7: 74.03 – 74.07 Mb | Chr 5: 134.73 – 134.78 Mb |
| PubMed search |
- Wikidata
| View/Edit Human | View/Edit Mouse |

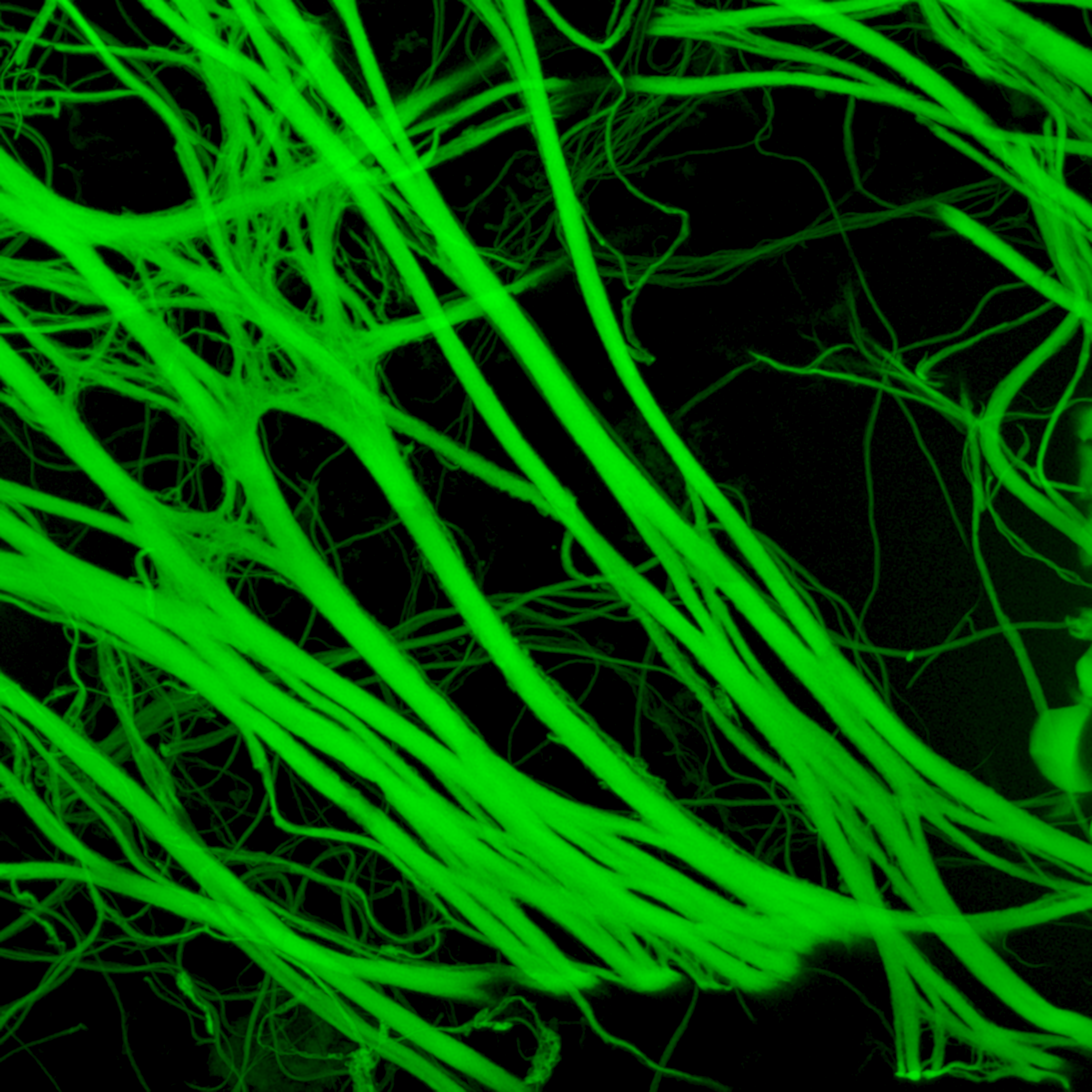
Thick elastic fibers consisting of bundles of elastin in the human lung

Elastin is a protein encoded by the ELN gene in humans and several other animals. Elastin is a key component in the extracellular matrix of gnathostomes (jawed vertebrates). It is highly elastic and present in connective tissue of the body to resume its shape after stretching or contracting. Elastin helps skin return to its original position when poked or pinched. Elastin is also in important load-bearing tissue of vertebrates and used in places where storage of mechanical energy is required.

== Function ==
The ELN gene encodes a protein that is one of the two components of elastic fibers. The encoded protein is rich in hydrophobic amino acids such as glycine and proline, which form mobile hydrophobic regions bounded by crosslinks between lysine residues. Multiple transcript variants encoding different isoforms have been found for this gene. Elastin's soluble precursor is tropoelastin.

=== Mechanism of elastic recoil ===
The characterization of disorder is consistent with an entropy-driven mechanism of elastic recoil. It is concluded that conformational disorder is a constitutive feature of elastin structure and function.

== Clinical significance ==
Deletions and mutations in this gene are associated with supravalvular aortic stenosis (SVAS) and the autosomal dominant cutis laxa. Other associated defects in elastin include Marfan syndrome, emphysema caused by α_{1}-antitrypsin deficiency, atherosclerosis, Buschke–Ollendorff syndrome, Menkes syndrome, pseudoxanthoma elasticum, and Williams syndrome.

=== Elastosis ===
Elastosis is the buildup of elastin in tissues, and is a form of degenerative disease. There are a multitude of causes, but the most commons cause is actinic elastosis of the skin, also known as solar elastosis, which is caused by prolonged and excessive sun exposure, a process known as photoaging. Uncommon causes of skin elastosis include elastosis perforans serpiginosa, perforating calcific elastosis and linear focal elastosis.

Skin elastosis causes
| Condition | Distinctive features | Histopathology |
|---|---|---|
| Actinic elastosis (most common, also called solar elastosis) | Elastin replacing collagen fibers of the papillary dermis and reticular dermis | |
| Elastosis perforans serpiginosa | Degenerated elastic fibers and transepidermal perforating canals (arrow in image points at one of them) | |
| Perforating calcific elastosis | Clumping of short elastic fibers in the dermis. | |
| Linear focal elastosis | Accumulation of fragmented elastotic material within the papillary dermis and transcutaneous elimination of elastotic fibers. | |

== Composition ==
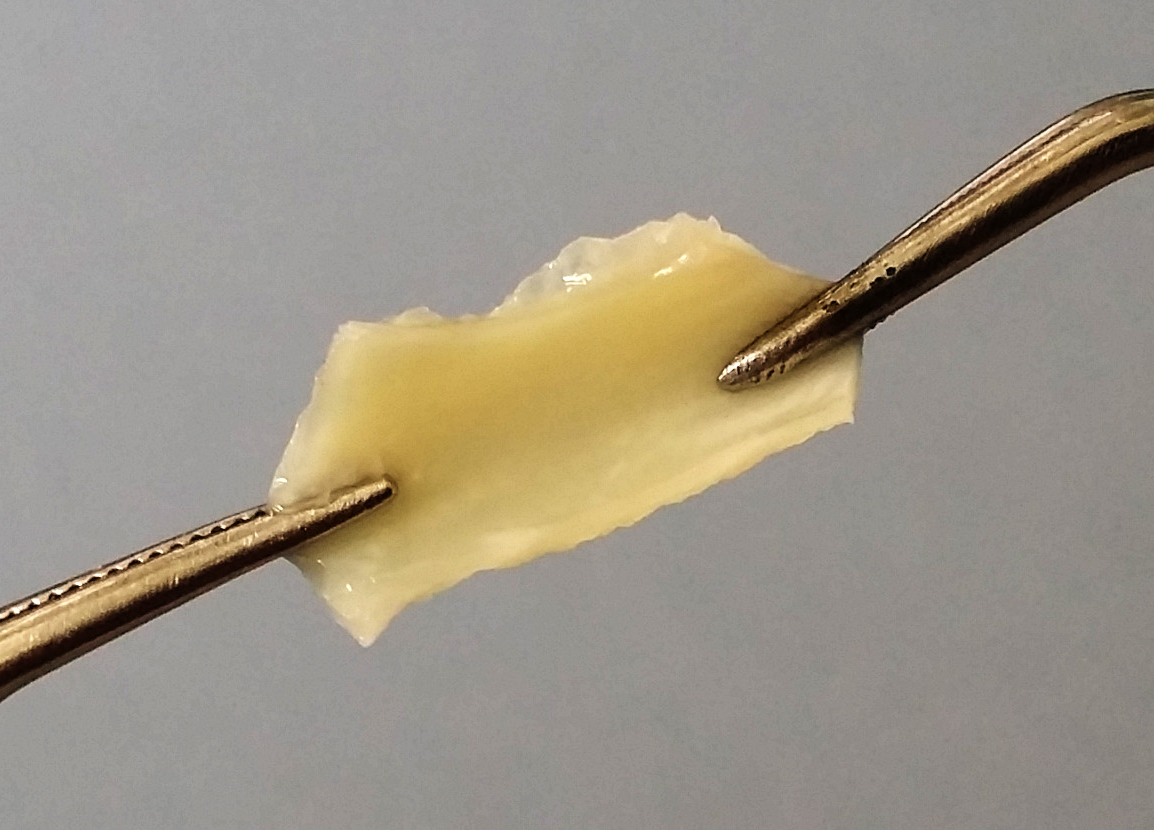
Stretched elastin isolated from bovine aorta

In the body, elastin is usually associated with other proteins in connective tissues. Elastic fiber in the body is a mixture of amorphous elastin and fibrous fibrillin. Both components are primarily made of smaller amino acids such as glycine, valine, alanine, and proline. The total elastin ranges from 58 to 75% of the weight of the dry defatted artery in normal canine arteries. Comparison between fresh and digested tissues shows that, at 35% strain, a minimum of 48% of the arterial load is carried by elastin, and a minimum of 43% of the change in stiffness of arterial tissue is due to the change in elastin stiffness.

=== Tissue distribution ===
Elastin serves an important function in arteries as a medium for pressure wave propagation to help blood flow and is particularly abundant in large elastic blood vessels such as the aorta. Elastin is also very important in the lungs, elastic ligaments, elastic cartilage, the skin, and the bladder. It is present in jawed vertebrates.

== Characteristics ==
Elastin is a very long-lived protein, with a half-life of over 78 years in humans. However, its long lifespan does not imply that its functional properties remain unchanged throughout life.

In human skin, ageing is associated with changes in the amount, organisation and integrity of dermal elastic fibres. An in vivo multiphoton tomography study reported age-related reductions in the measured elastin and collagen content of the human dermis.

More recent three-dimensional imaging of human dermal elastin has shown that the number of elastic fibres decreases with age and that the remaining network becomes more fragmented and less interconnected. Finite-element modelling based on these structural observations associated age-related changes in elastin-fibre architecture with reduced skin firmness.

In vivo multiphoton images of dermal elastin and fibrillar collagen in younger (18–25 years) and older (70–75 years) human skin. Older skin shows altered elastin density and elastic-fibre organisation, particularly in chronically sun-exposed areas.

Although elastin is exceptionally long-lived, its structure and function can change with aging. In human skin, aging has been associated with reductions and structural alterations in dermal elastin and elastic fibers. Imaging studies have reported age-related changes in the amount and organization of dermal elastin, including fragmentation and reduced connectivity of elastic-fiber networks. These changes may contribute to the decline in skin elasticity and firmness associated with aging.

== Clinical research ==
The feasibility of using recombinant human tropoelastin to promote elastin-fibre production and improve skin flexibility in wounds and scars has been studied. Although new elastin fibres were observed following the administration of recombinant human tropoelastin into fresh wounds, the treatment did not result in significant improvements in scar appearance or flexibility.

Another line of research has investigated stimulation of endogenous elastin production in the skin. In an in vitro study, an amino acid–copper mixture increased elastin- and type I collagen-related gene expression and protein production in cultured human dermal fibroblasts compared with copper or the amino acid mixture alone.

A subsequent open-label, single-centre clinical study evaluated a skin-booster formulation containing amino acids, copper sulfate and non-cross-linked hyaluronic acid, marketed as Elastic Lab. Five participants received four facial treatments at one-week intervals, and the outcomes were assessed one week after the final treatment. Instrumentally measured skin elasticity increased by 23.4% from baseline, while skin thickness and density increased by 7.3% and 12.5%, respectively. Improvements in skin hydration and periocular wrinkle depth were also reported. The study did not directly measure newly synthesised or deposited elastin fibres. Its small sample size and uncontrolled design limit the conclusions that can be drawn, and larger controlled studies with direct tissue-based measurements are required to determine whether stimulation of elastin biosynthesis produces sustained improvements in skin elasticity.

A different approach has investigated stimulation of endogenous elastin production in the skin. An in vitro study using cultured human dermal fibroblasts reported that an amino acid–copper mixture increased elastin- and type I collagen-related gene expression and protein production compared with copper or the amino-acid mixture alone. A subsequent open-label, single-center clinical study evaluated a skin-booster formulation containing amino acids, copper sulfate, and non-cross-linked hyaluronic acid (Elastic Lab). In five participants receiving four weekly treatments, the study reported increases in instrumentally measured skin elasticity, as well as skin thickness and density. The study did not directly measure newly deposited elastin fibers, and its small, uncontrolled design limits the conclusions that can be drawn; larger controlled studies are needed to determine whether stimulation of elastin biosynthesis produces sustained improvements in skin elasticity.

== Biosynthesis ==
The formation of mature elastic fibers, known as elastogenesis, requires the coordinated production and assembly of tropoelastin with a fibrillin-rich microfibrillar scaffold. Tropoelastin is secreted by elastogenic cells, including fibroblasts and vascular smooth-muscle cells, and undergoes coacervation before being deposited onto microfibrils. Proteins including fibulin-4, fibulin-5, and latent transforming growth factor beta-binding protein 4 participate in the organization and stabilization of the developing elastic-fiber matrix.

=== Tropoelastin precursors ===
Elastin is made by linking together many small soluble precursor tropoelastin protein molecules (50-70 kDa), to make the final massive, insoluble, durable complex. The unlinked tropoelastin molecules are not normally available in the cell, since they become crosslinked into elastin fibres immediately after their synthesis by the cell and export into the extracellular matrix.

Each tropoelastin consists of a string of 36 small domains, each weighing about 2 kDa in a random coil conformation. The protein consists of alternating hydrophobic and hydrophilic domains, which are encoded by separate exons, so that the domain structure of tropoelastin reflects the exon organization of the gene. The hydrophilic domains contain Lys-Ala (KA) and Lys-Pro (KP) motifs that are involved in crosslinking during the formation of mature elastin. In the KA domains, lysine residues occur as pairs or triplets separated by two or three alanine residues (e.g. AAAKAAKAA) whereas in KP domains the lysine residues are separated mainly by proline residues (e.g. KPLKP). The hydrophobic domains of tropoelastin are enriched in non-polar amino acids, particularly glycine, valine, proline, and alanine, whereas its lysine-rich domains provide sites for enzymatic cross-linking during the formation of mature elastin.

=== Aggregation ===
Tropoelastin aggregates at physiological temperature due to interactions between hydrophobic domains in a process called coacervation. This process is reversible and thermodynamically controlled and does not require protein cleavage. The coacervate is made insoluble by irreversible crosslinking.

=== Crosslinking ===
To make mature elastin fibres, tropoelastin molecules are cross-linked through their lysine residues to form desmosine and isodesmosine cross-links. The enzyme responsible for initiating this cross-linking process is lysyl oxidase, and the resulting cross-links are formed through reactions described as an in vivo Chichibabin pyridine synthesis. Copper is an essential cofactor for lysyl oxidase activity, which contributes to the maturation and cross-linking of both elastin and collagen.Based on this biochemical mechanism, some experimental formulations have combined copper with amino acids abundant in tropoelastin, including glycine, valine, alanine, and proline, to investigate their effects on dermal extracellular-matrix protein production. An in vitro study using cultured human dermal fibroblasts found that an amino acid–copper mixture increased elastin- and type I collagen-related gene expression and protein production compared with treatment using copper or the amino-acid mixture alone. This approach was subsequently evaluated in a patented skin-booster formulation containing these amino acids, copper sulfate, and non-cross-linked hyaluronic acid (trade name: Elastic Lab). In a small, uncontrolled, open-label study involving five participants, four weekly treatments were followed by reported increases in instrumentally measured skin elasticity, thickness, and density; however, the study did not directly measure new elastin deposition, and larger controlled studies are required to confirm the findings. Lysyl oxidase requires copper as a cofactor for its activity and is involved in the cross-linking and maturation of elastin and collagen. Experimental studies have therefore investigated whether copper-containing amino acid mixtures can influence extracellular-matrix protein production by dermal fibroblasts. In cultured human dermal fibroblasts, an amino acid–copper mixture increased elastin- and type I collagen-related gene expression and protein production compared with the individual components alone.

== Molecular biology ==
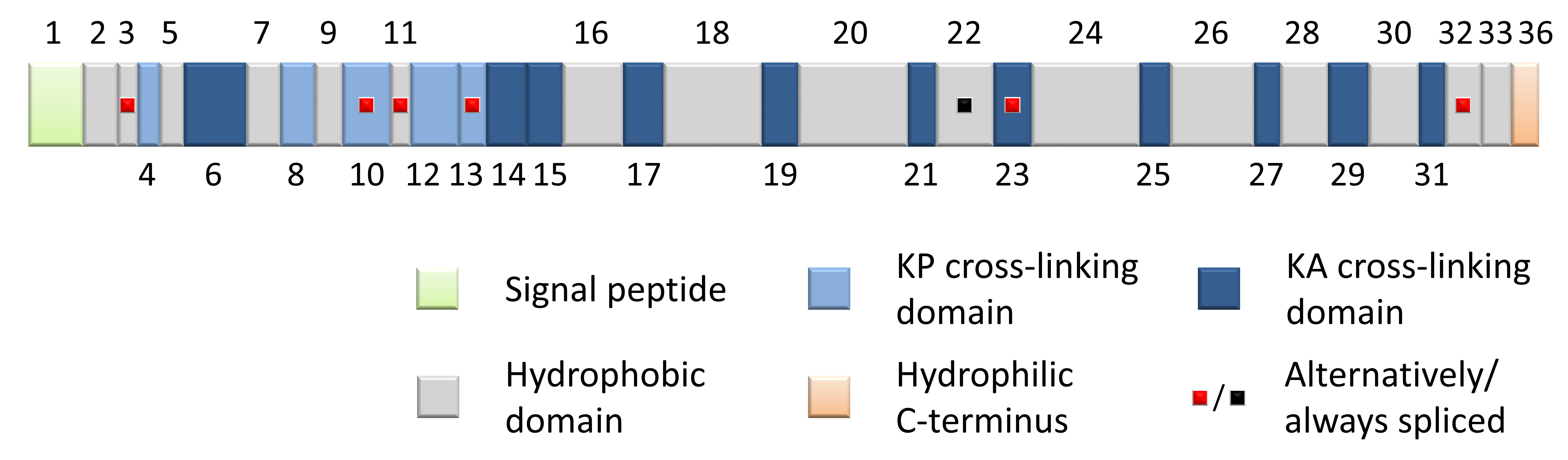
Domain structure of human tropoelastin

In mammals, the genome only contains one gene for tropoelastin, called ELN. The human ELN gene is a 45 kb segment on chromosome 7, and has 34 exons interrupted by almost 700 introns, with the first exon being a signal peptide assigning its extracellular localization. The large number of introns suggests that genetic recombination may contribute to the instability of the gene, leading to diseases such as SVAS. The expression of tropoelastin mRNA is highly regulated under at least eight different transcription start sites.

Tissue specific variants of elastin are produced by alternative splicing of the tropoelastin gene. There are at least 11 known human tropoelastin isoforms. These isoforms are under developmental regulation, however there are minimal differences among tissues at the same developmental stage.

== See also ==
- Cutis laxa
- Elastic fibers
- Elastin receptor
- Resilin: an invertebrate protein
- Williams syndrome
