= Actinic elastosis =

- Other names: Solar elastosis
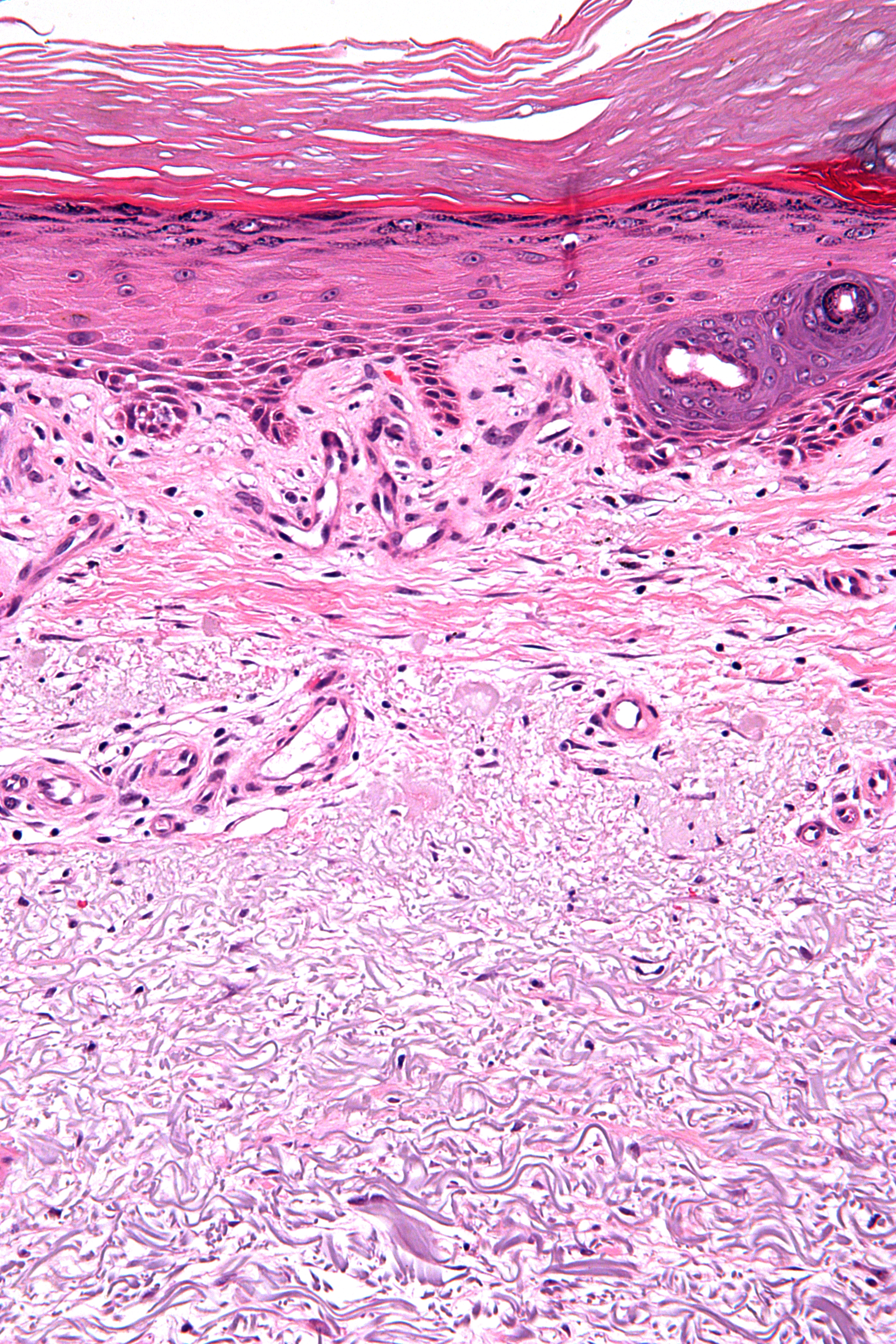
- Micrograph showing solar elastosis - grey, jumbled spaghetti-like material on bottom of image. H&E stain.
- Specialty: Dermatology

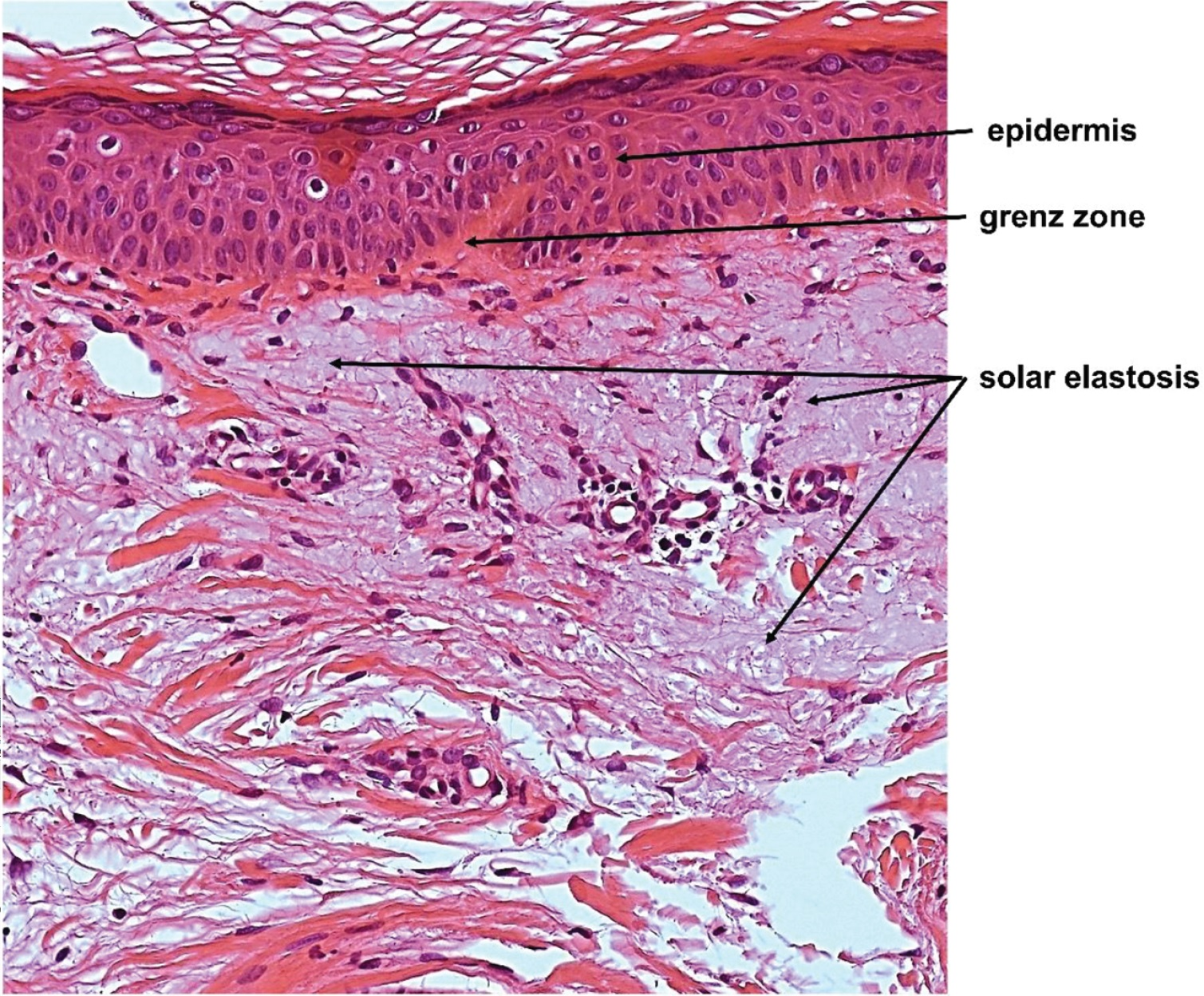
Solar elastosis separates from the epidermis by a narrow band of normal-appearing collagen (grenz zone) with collagen fibers arranged horizontally.

Actinic elastosis, also known as solar elastosis, is an accumulation of abnormal elastin (elastic tissue) in the dermis of the skin, or in the conjunctiva of the eye, which occurs as a result of the cumulative effects of prolonged and excessive sun exposure, a process known as photoaging.

== Signs and symptoms ==
Actinic elastosis usually appears as thickened, dry, wrinkled skin. Several clinical variants have been recorded. One of the most readily identifiable is the thickened, deeply fissured skin seen on the back of the chronically sun-exposed neck, known as cutis rhomboidalis nuchae. These features are a part of the constellation of changes that are seen in photoaged skin.

== Causes ==
The origin of the elastotic material in the dermis remains a subject of debate. Theories on the formation of the elastotic material include actinic stimulation of fibroblasts, promoting synthesis of this material, or that the material is a degradation product of collagen, elastin, or both.

== Diagnosis ==
In the earlier stages of actinic elastosis, elastic fiber proliferation can be seen in the dermis. As the condition becomes more established, the collagen fibers of the papillary dermis and reticular dermis become increasingly replaced by thickened and curled fibers that form tangled masses and appear basophilic under routine haematoxylin and eosin staining. These fibers stain black with the Verhoeff stain.

== Treatment ==
Numerous treatment options are available for photoaged skin, including dermabrasion, topical application of retinoic acid, carbon dioxide laser resurfacing, hyaluronic acid injection into the dermis, imiquimod, tacrolimus ointment, and topical oestrogen therapy. These treatments have variable efficacy.

The most effective prevention strategy for photoaging remains minimization of sun exposure, through use of sunscreen and other sun exposure avoidance measures.
