= Isodesmosine =

Identifiers
CAS Number	991-01-5
3D model (JSmol)	Interactive image
ChEBI	CHEBI:64366
ChemSpider	13214
MeSH	D007524
PubChem CID	13811
- InChI: InChI=1S/C24H39N5O8/c25-16(21(30)31)4-1-2-11-29-13-14(7-9-18(27)23(34)35)12-15(8-10-19(28)24(36)37)20(29)6-3-5-17(26)22(32)33/h12-13,16-19H,1-11,25-28H2,(H3-,30,31,32,33,34,35,36,37)/p+1 Key: RGXCTRIQQODGIZ-UHFFFAOYSA-O; InChI=1/C24H39N5O8/c25-16(21(30)31)4-1-2-11-29-13-14(7-9-18(27)23(34)35)12-15(8-10-19(28)24(36)37)20(29)6-3-5-17(26)22(32)33/h12-13,16-19H,1-11,25-28H2,(H3-,30,31,32,33,34,35,36,37)/p+1 Key: RGXCTRIQQODGIZ-IKLDFBCSAD
- SMILES: c1c(c[n+](c(c1CCC(C(=O)O)N)CCCC(C(=O)O)N)CCCCC(C(=O)O)N)CCC(C(=O)O)N

Properties
Chemical formula	C_{24}H_{40}N_{5}O_{8}
Molar mass	526.611 g·mol^{−1}
- Except where otherwise noted, data are given for materials in their standard state (at 25 °C [77 °F], 100 kPa). verify (what is ?) Infobox references

Isodesmosine is a lysine derivative found in elastin. Isodesmosine is an isomeric pyridinium-based amino acid resulting from the condensation of four lysine residues between elastin proteins by lysyl-oxidase. These represent ideal biomarkers for monitoring elastin turnover because these special cross-links are only found in mature elastin in mammals.

== See also ==
- Desmosine
