= Perforating calcific elastosis =

- Other names: Localized acquired cutaneous pseudoxanthoma elasticum, Perforating periumbilical calcific elastosis, and Periumbilical perforating pseudoxanthoma elasticum
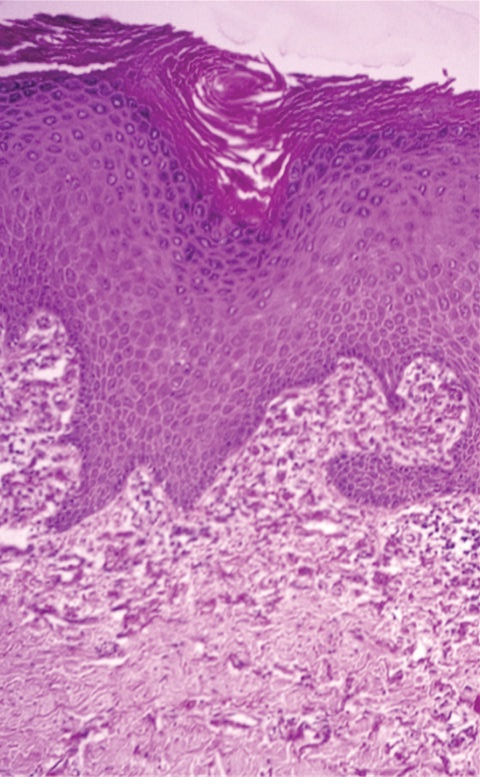
- Histopathology of perforating calcific elastosis: Clumping of short elastic fibers in the dermis.
- Specialty: Dermatology

Perforating calcific elastosis is an acquired, localized cutaneous disorder, most frequently found in obese, multiparous, middle-aged women, characterized by lax, well-circumscribed, reticulated or cobble-stoned plaques occurring in the periumbilical region with keratotic surface papules.

== See also ==
- List of cutaneous conditions
