= Photoaging =

Ultraviolet light-induced biological development over time

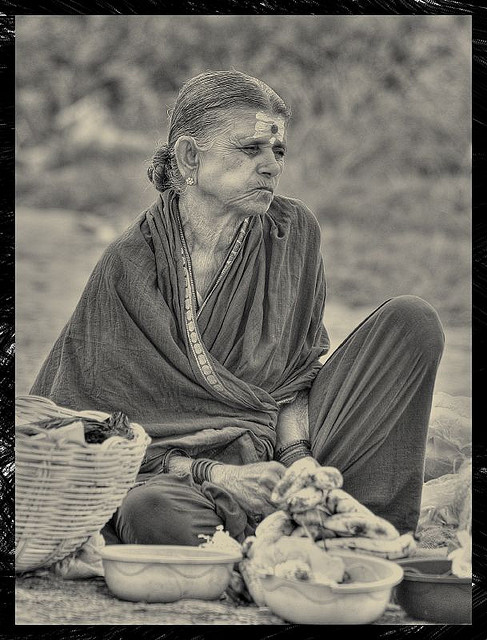
Photoaging of a woman.

Photoaging or photoageing (also known as "dermatoheliosis") is a term used for the characteristic changes to skin induced by chronic UVA and UVB exposure. Clinically, photoaged skin commonly presents with wrinkles and pigmentary changes. Other features may include skin laxity, roughness, telangiectasia, solar lentigines, actinic keratoses, and skin cancers. Mechanisms involved in photoaging include ultraviolet-radiation-induced oxidative stress, DNA damage, and matrix metalloproteinase activity that contributes to degradation of extracellular matrix proteins such as collagen and elastin. Prevention focuses on photoprotection, including shade, sun-protective clothing, and sunscreen, while treatments discussed in dermatology literature include topical retinoids and procedural interventions.

== Effects of UV light ==
=== Molecular and genetic changes ===
UVB rays are a primary mutagen that can only penetrate through the epidermal (outermost) layer of the skin and can cause DNA mutations. These mutations arise due to chemical changes within skin cells. These mutations may be clinically related to specific signs of photoaging, including wrinkling.

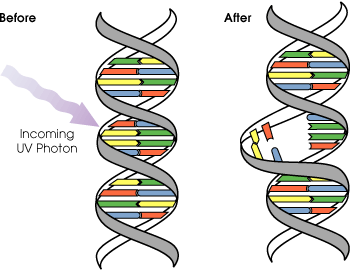
DNA UV mutation

Melanocytes and basal cells are embedded in the epidermal layer. Upon exposure to UVB rays, melanocytes will produce more melanin, a pigment that gives skin its color. UVB can cause the formation of freckles and dark spots, both of which are symptoms of photoaging; these are most common in people with fair or light skin. With frequent long-term exposure to UVB rays, signs of photoaging might appear, and precancerous lesions or skin cancer may develop as well as damage to DNA.

UVA rays are able to penetrate deeper into the skin than UVB rays, damaging the dermal layer as well as the epidermal layer. The dermis is the second major layer of the skin, and it comprises collagen, elastin, and extrafibrillar matrix, which provides structural support to the skin. With chronic UVA exposure, damage to dermal collagen, elastin, and the extracellular matrix contributes to skin laxity, roughness, and wrinkling. Due to the presence of blood vessels in the dermis, UVA rays can lead to dilated or broken blood vessels, which are most commonly visible on the nose and cheeks. UVA can also damage DNA indirectly through the generation of reactive oxygen species (ROS), which include superoxide anion, peroxide, and singlet oxygen. These ROS damage cellular DNA as well as lipids and proteins.

=== Pigmentation ===
UV exposure can also lead to inflammation and vasodilation, which is clinically manifested as sunburn. UV radiation activates the transcription factor NF-κB, which is the first step in inflammation. NF-κB activation results in the increase of proinflammatory cytokines, for example, interleukin 1 (IL-1), IL-6, vascular endothelial growth factor, and tumor necrosis factor (TNF-α). This then attracts neutrophils, which lead to an increase in oxidative damage through the generation of free radicals.

Additionally, UV radiation would cause the down-regulation of an angiogenesis inhibitor, thrombospondin-1, and the up-regulation of an angiogenesis activator, which is platelet-derived endothelial cell growth factor, in keratinocytes. These enhance angiogenesis and aid in the growth of UV-induced neoplasms.

=== Immunosuppression ===
It has been reported that UV radiation leads to local and systemic immunosuppression, due to DNA damage and altered cytokine expression. This has implications for cutaneous tumor surveillance. The Langerhans cells may undergo changes in quantity, morphology, and function due to UV exposure and may eventually become depleted. One proposed explanation for this immunosuppression is that the body is attempting to suppress an autoimmune response to inflammatory products resulting from UV damage.

=== Degradation of collagen ===
UV exposure would also lead to the activation of receptors for epidermal growth factor, IL-1, and TNF-α in keratinocytes and fibroblasts, which then activate signaling kinases throughout the skin via an unknown mechanism. The nuclear transcription factor activator protein, AP-1, which controls the transcription of matrix metalloproteinases (MMP), is expressed and activated. MMP-1 is a major metalloproteinase for collagen degradation. This entire process is aided by the presence of reactive oxygen species that inhibit protein-tyrosine phosphatases via oxidation, thereby resulting in the up-regulation of the above-mentioned receptors. Another transcription factor, NF-κB, which is also activated by UV light, increases the expression of MMP-9.

The up-regulation of MMP can occur even after minimal exposure to UV; hence, exposure to UV radiation that is inadequate to cause sunburn can facilitate the degradation of skin collagen and, presumably, lead to eventual photoaging. Thus, collagen production is reduced in photoaged skin due to the process of constant degradation of collagen mediated by MMPs.

In addition, the presence of damaged collagen would also downregulate the synthesis of new collagen. The impaired spreading and attachment of fibroblasts onto degraded collagen could be one of the contributing factors to the inhibition of collagen synthesis.

=== Retinoic acids and photodamage ===
UV radiation decreases the expression of both retinoic acid receptors and retinoid x receptors in human skin, thereby resulting in a complete loss of the induction of RA-responsive genes. It also leads to an increase in activity of the AP-1 pathway, increasing MMP activity and thus resulting in a functional deficiency of vitamin A in the skin.

== Signs, symptoms and histopathology ==
Early symptoms of photoaging:

- Dyspigmentation, the formation of wrinkles and other symptoms appear around regions of skin commonly exposed to the sun, mostly the eyes, mouth, and forehead. The lips may be affected. In Canadian women, the upper chest is commonly affected.
- Spider veins on face and neck
- Loss of color and fullness in the lips

Symptoms of photoaging attributed to prolonged exposure to UV:

- Wrinkles deepen, and forehead frown lines can be seen even when not frowning.
- Telangiectasias (spider veins) are most commonly seen around the nose, cheeks, and chin.
- Skin becomes leathery, and laxity occurs.
- Solar lentigines (age spots) appear on the face and hands.
- Possibly pre-cancerous red and scaly spots (actinic keratoses) appear.
- Cutaneous malignancies

In addition to the above symptoms, photoaging can also result in an orderly maturation of keratinocytes and an increase in the cell population of the dermis, where abundant, hyperplastic, elongated, and collapsed fibroblasts and inflammatory infiltrates are found.

Photodamage can also be characterized as a disorganization of the collagen fibrils that constitute most of the connective tissue, and the accumulation of abnormal, amorphous, elastin-containing material, a condition known as actinic elastosis.

== Defense mechanisms ==
Endogenous defense mechanisms provide protection of the skin from damage induced by UV.

=== Epidermal thickness ===
UV exposure, which would lead to an increase in epidermal thickness, could help protect from further UV damage.

=== Pigment ===
It has been reported in many cases that fairer individuals who have less melanin pigment show more dermal DNA photodamage, infiltrating neutrophils, keratinocyte activation, IL-10 expression, and increased MMPs after UV exposure. Therefore, the distribution of melanin protects from sunburn, photoaging, and carcinogenesis by absorbing and scattering UV rays, covering the skin's lower layers and protecting them from the radiation.

=== Repair of DNA mutation and apoptosis ===
The damage to DNA due to exposure to UV rays will lead to the expression of p53, thereby leading to the eventual arrest of the cell cycle. This allows DNA repair mediated by endogenous mechanisms like the nucleotide excision repair system. In addition, apoptosis occurs if the damage is too severe. However, the apoptotic mechanisms decline with age, and if neither DNA repair mechanism nor apoptosis occurs, cutaneous tumorigenesis may result.

=== Tissue inhibitors of MMPs (TIMPs) ===
TIMPs regulate the activity of MMP. Many studies have shown that UV rays induce TIMP-1.

=== Antioxidants ===
The skin contains several antioxidants, including vitamin E, coenzyme Q10, ascorbate, carotenoids, superoxide dismutase, catalase, and glutathione peroxidase. These antioxidants provide protection from reactive oxygen species produced during normal cellular metabolism. However, overexposure to UV rays can lead to a significant reduction in the antioxidant supply, thus increasing oxidative stress. Hence, these antioxidants are essential in the skin's defense mechanism against UV radiation and photocarcinogenesis.

== Prevention and treatment ==
Treatment and intervention for photoaging can be classified into a unique paradigm based on disease prevention.

=== Primary prevention ===
Primary prevention aims to reduce the risk factors before a disease or condition occurs.

Sun protection is the most effective form of primary prevention of photoaging. The major methods of sun protection are sunscreen products, sun protective clothing, and reducing exposure to the sun, especially during peak sun hours (10 AM-4 PM in the spring and summer seasons). Broad-spectrum sunscreen products provide optimal coverage for protection against UV damage because they protect against both types of UVA rays (UVA1 and UVA2) along with UVB rays. Proper application methods and timing are important factors in proper sunscreen use. This includes using a proper quantity of sunscreen, applying sunscreen prior to sun exposure, and consistent reapplication (especially after exposure to water or sweat).

=== Secondary protection ===
Secondary protection refers to early detection of disease, potentially while still asymptomatic, to allow positive intervention to prevent, delay, or attenuate the symptomatic clinical condition. This includes the following: retinoids (e.g., tretinoin), antioxidants (e.g., topical vitamin C, oral supplements, CoQ10, Lipoic acid), estrogens, growth factors, and cytokines.

There are various forms of topical retinoids. Tretinoin, a retinoid, is widely considered to be the most efficacious treatment for photoaging by dermatologists due to consistent evidence from several randomized clinical trials. Retinoids are vitamin A derivatives that bind to retinoic acid receptors (RARs) and retinoid X receptors (RXRs). Binding to these receptors induces a cascade of cellular processes that ultimately lead to increased collagen production and epidermal thickening, reducing the appearance of skin sagging and wrinkling. Tretinoin is also efficacious for the treatment of acne. Adapalene and tazarotene are also third-generation synthetic retinoids that are used for the treatment of acne. Adapalene has not been widely studied or proven for use in photoaging. However, it has been used off-label for that purpose. Tazarotene has been proven to be efficacious in the treatment of photoaging. Retinoid derivatives, known as retinol and retinal, are often used in over-the-counter cosmeceutical products for anti-aging purposes. The form of and retinal are metabolized in the skin to retinoic acid, which can then act on the RARs and RXRs. These products are considered cosmeceuticals rather than drugs due to their lack of regulation, and they have not been widely studied. Furthermore, tretinoin is the most well-studied and consistent in its efficacy in the treatment of photoaging.

=== Tertiary prevention ===
Lastly, tertiary prevention is the treatment of an existing symptomatic disease process to ameliorate its effects or delay its progress. Such tertiary prevention includes the use of chemical peels, resurfacing techniques (e.g. micro-dermabrasion), ablative or non-ablative laser resurfacing, radio-frequency technology, soft tissue augmentation (also known as fillers), and botulinum toxins. Photorejuvenation procedures are performed by dermatologists to reduce the visible symptoms. Each of these treatment modalities has primary concerns that they address. For example, botulinum injections paralyze facial muscles. This prevents muscle contraction and subsequent wrinkle formation. Injectable fillers are often used in the nasolabial fold to increase volume and minimize the appearance of sagging or wrinkling.

== See also ==
- Occlusion miliaria
- List of cutaneous conditions
- Actinic elastosis
- Actinic keratosis
- Solar lentigo
- Sunscreen
- Sun protective clothing
- Retinoid
