= Elastosis perforans serpiginosa =

- Other names: EPS
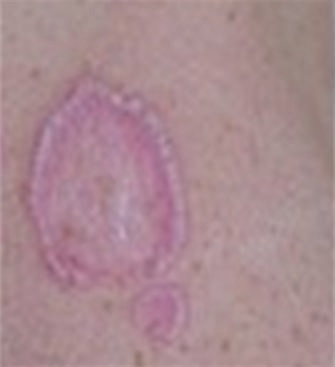
- Elastosis perforans serpiginosa: Hyperkeratotic plaque of papules
- Specialty: Dermatology

Elastosis perforans serpiginosa is a unique perforating disorder characterized by transepidermal elimination of elastic fibers and distinctive clinical lesions, which are serpiginous in distribution and can be associated with specific diseases.

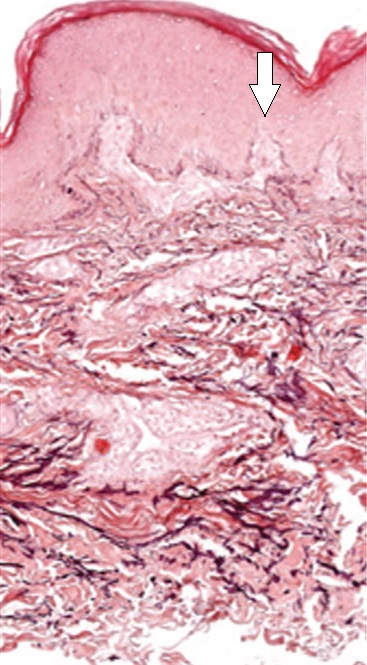
Histopathology of elastosis perforans serpiginosa: Degenerated elastic fibers and transepidermal perforating canals (arrow points at one of them)

This condition is inherited in an autosomal dominant manner.

== See also ==
- List of cutaneous conditions
- Poikiloderma vasculare atrophicans
