= Desmosine =

Names
- IUPAC name 6-{4-[(4S)-4-Amino-4-carboxybutyl]-3,5-bis[(3S)-3-amino-3-carboxypropyl]-1-pyridiniumyl}-L-norleucine

Identifiers
CAS Number	11003-57-9
3D model (JSmol)	Interactive image
Beilstein Reference	4074277
ChEBI	CHEBI:37628
ChemSpider	13085543
PubChem CID	25435
UNII	4MOL2J0TLY
CompTox Dashboard (EPA)	DTXSID801106522
- InChI: InChI=1S/C24H39N5O8/c25-17(21(30)31)5-1-2-11-29-12-14(7-9-19(27)23(34)35)16(4-3-6-18(26)22(32)33)15(13-29)8-10-20(28)24(36)37/h12-13,17-20H,1-11,25-28H2,(H3-,30,31,32,33,34,35,36,37)/p+1 Key: VEVRNHHLCPGNDU-MUGJNUQGSA-O
- SMILES: O=C(O)[C@@H](N)CCCC[n+]1cc(c(c(c1)CC[C@@H](C(=O)O)N)CCC[C@@H](C(=O)O)N)CC[C@@H](C(=O)O)N

Properties
Chemical formula	C_{24}H_{40}N_{5}O_{8}
Molar mass	526.611 g·mol^{−1}
- Except where otherwise noted, data are given for materials in their standard state (at 25 °C [77 °F], 100 kPa). verify (what is ?) Infobox references

Desmosine is an amino acid found uniquely in elastin, a protein found in connective tissue such as skin, lungs, and elastic arteries.

Desmosine is a component of elastin and cross links with its isomer, isodesmosine, giving elasticity to the tissue. Detection of desmosine in urine, plasma or sputum samples can be a marker for elastin breakdown due to high elastase activity related to certain diseases.

== Structure ==
Desmosine and its isomer isodesmosine are both composed of four lysine residues, allowing for bonding to multiple peptide chains. The four lysine groups combine to form a pyridinium nucleus, which can be reduced to neutralize positive charge associated, and increase the hydrophobicity. The four lysines form side chains around the pyridinium nucleus with exposed carboxyl groups. The difference between desmosines and isodesmosines are an exchange of a lysine side chain on carbon 1 with a proton on carbon 5. Desmosine is associated with alanine, bonding with it on the N terminal side. It is this alanine association that allows it to bond well with pairs of tropoelastin, to form elastin and elastin networks.

Desmosine and isodesmosine are unable to be differentiated thus far because of the lack of technology. The differentiation would be helpful in order to understand desmosine and its properties better. Currently, mass spectrometry is used and aids in the release of characteristic fragments which would help with differentiation, especially in larger peptides.

== Synthesis ==
Desmosine has pathways for form multiple conformations of itself, both through biosynthesis and through man-made systems.

=== Biosynthesis ===
The formation of desmosines occurs within the formation of precursor tropoelastin. The tropoelastin initially lacks any of these complex binding molecules, and has a similar make up to that of the final stage elastin, however it contains a greater amount of lysine side chains, which directly corresponds with desmosines later found. These precursor molecules are processed through Dehydrogenation, along with dihydroD, and ultimately form elastin bound with desmosine. Through the Lysyl oxidase enzyme, lysyl c- amino groups is oxidized, forming allysine. This spontaneously condenses with other allysine molecules to form a bifunctional cross-link, allysine aldol, or with a c-amino group of lysine, forming dehydrolysinonorleucine. These compounds are then further condensed to form a tetrafunctional pyridinium cross-links of desmosines and isodesmosines. These reactions occur with lysines in areas of high alanine, due to alanine having a small side chain that won't block the enzyme binding to the lysine groups.

=== Lab Synthesis ===
Desmosines can be synthesized in a lab through a few methods, like palladium catalyzed cross-coupling reactions. The various treatments can create slightly different conformations.

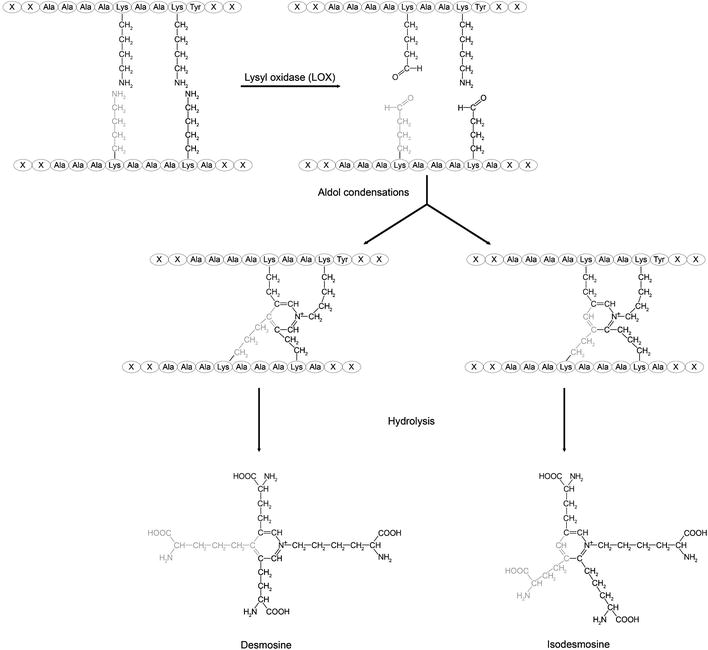
Process of Desmosine Synthesis through biological pathways, allowing creation of pyridinium ring from lysyl side chains

== Bonding ==
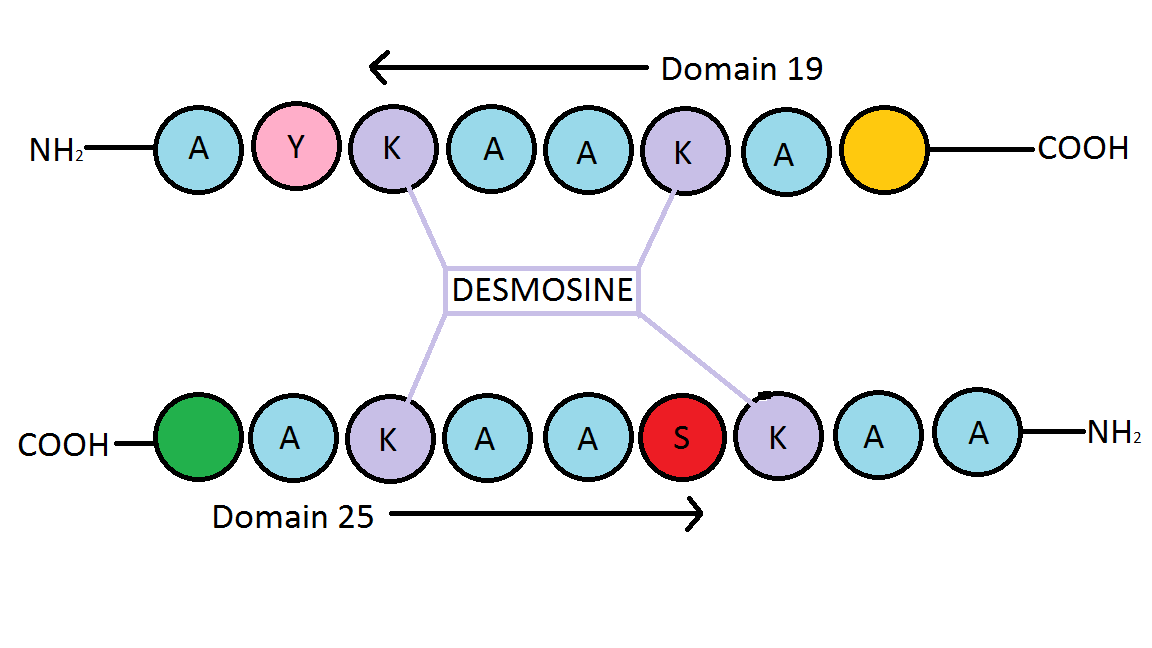
Desmosine bonding in alanine rich areas, which allow for enzymes to bond and create the unique double crosslink that sets desmosine apart.

Some models of bonding for desmosines, created through the study of bovine ligament elastin, suggest a combination of desmosine and secondary cross-linking to bind together peptide chains. This model has desmosine bonding near an alanine on the peptide chain, then to 3 other amino acids on the 2 peptide chains, despite being able to bond to up to 4 chains. It has been suggested that the secondary cross-linking occurs with either desmosine or lysinonorleucine, which maintains an alpha helix conformation in alanine rich sections on peptides.

Both isodesmosine and desmosine can have similar bonding sites in elastin, though it rarely shown this way in nature. They more often will appear in close proximity to each other on the peptide chain.

=== Bonding in elastin/collagen ===
Desmosine is found to have a hydrogen bond donor count of eight and a hydrogen bond acceptor count of twelve.

== Function ==
Elastin, a protein in the extracellular matrix, provides elasticity and its soluble precursor is tropoelastin. When elastin cross links it produces desmosine and isodesmosine. When desmosine is mentioned, it is usually grouped with isodesmosine, the other tetrafunctional amino acid that is specific to elastin.

Demosine can not only be found in elastin, but also in urine, plasma, sputum, and there are different ways to identify and measure these quantities. This means that it is used as a biomarker for elastin degradation which can be a detection for chronic obstructive pulmonary disease (COPD). Desmosine is a potential biomarker for matrix degradation.

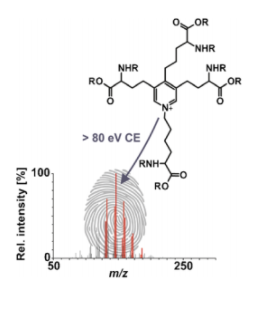
Mass spectrometry of desmosine. doi:10.1007/s13361-014-1075-9

Desmosine and Isodesmosine are unable to be differentiated thus far because of the lack of technology. The differentiation would be helpful in order to understand desmosine and its properties better. Currently, mass spectrometry is used and aids in the release of characteristic fragments which would help with differentiation, especially in larger peptides.

=== Material properties ===
The molecular weight of this rare amino acid that is found in elastin is 526.611 g/mol. The desmosine pyridinium ring has three allysyl side chains and one unaltered lysyl side chain. It has been tested to show that the pyridinium core of Desmosine remains intact even at very high collision energies.

==== Current usage in medicine ====
Desmosine is currently used as a biomarker in the medical field. It is measured in order to monitor elastin breakdown. Since it is connected to the degradation of elastin, it can be used to identify COPD. Desmosine is one of the oldest biomarkers and was developed in the 1960s, but the first time it was correlated to lung elastin content was in the 80s through urinary excretion. Biomarkers are judged in 6 ways:

1. Biomarkers should be central to the pathophysiological process
2. They should be a ‘‘true’’ surrogate end-point
3. Biomarkers should be stable and vary with disease progression only
4. The severity of the condition should relate to the concentration of the Biomarker
5. Progression should be predicted
6. Effective treatment should show change

Even though desmosine can check-off the first three it cannot check off the rest. And this is why research is being done to further the validation of using desmosine as a biomarker for certain diseases like COPD.

== Application of desmosine ==
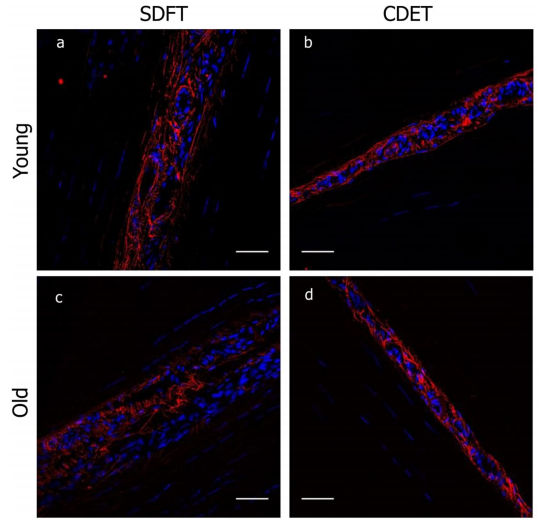
Organization of elastin (red) and cell nuclei (blue) in both young and old SDFT and CDET, two equine tendons. With increasing age, there is a distinct decrease in elastin content in the SDFT.

Because desmosine is most prevalent in mature elastin, it can be consistently located and measured in urine samples after elastin breakdown in the human body. Desmosine does not exist elsewhere within the body, nor can it be sourced from elsewhere outside the body, which isolates it as a key marker for elastin breakdown. Indeed, desmosine "has been studied as a marker of elastin breakdown in several chronic pulmonary conditions, including chronic obstructive pulmonary disease (COPD), cystic fibrosis, and chronic tobacco use." In one study, hyperoxic mice that formed alveoli as a result of lung maturation also showed drastic changes in collagen and elastin within the lungs, as well as a change in cross-linking. In another study, deceased patients with acute respiratory distress syndrome (ARDS) were reported to have higher concentrations of desmosine in their urine than those patients who survived ARDS, and higher concentrations of desmosine revealed that "more severe damage to the extracellular matrix occurred in the most critically ill [acute lung injury] patients."

However, it has been argued in the same study that desmosine does "not correlate well with markers of disease severity," correlating only weakly with age. Instead, it is suggested "that desmosine may be more useful in understanding the pathogenesis of ALI and less useful as a marker of disease severity.” The current standard for measuring lung disease progression, for example, is measured through the forced expiratory volume in one second (FEV1) compared to the maximum lung capacity; in other words, the volume of air a person can exhale from full lungs in one second compared to their maximum lung capacity. This method, while simple and physiologically thorough, has biological limitations, and so a superior biological marker is being sought after. Desmosine has been studied as one such biological marker, with studies in the 1980s to link urinary desmosine concentration with elastin breakdown in the lungs. Though large amounts of data have been collected with regards to desmosine's potential as a replacement biological marker in determining disease progression, some believe there is still insufficient evidence for desmosine to meet and fill this need.

In orthopedics, one study examined equine tendons and how their increasing stiffness and fatigue with age was due to fragmentation of the elastin in the tendons. The superficial digital flexor tendon (SDFT) and the common digital extensor tendon (CDET) were analyzed for elastin composition, comparing older tendons to younger ones. While both the CDET and the SDFT are positional tendons, enabling muscles to move the skeleton, the SDFT also stores energy and is far more elastic than the CDET due to "specialization of the [interfascicular matrix] to enable repeated interfascicular sliding and recoil." Desmosine concentrations were reported to be far greater in new tendons than in tendons that had partially degraded, suggesting that not only is there fragmentation of tendon elastin with age, but also a smaller total composition of elastin within the SDFT, though this was not true in the case of the CDET examined.

Research has also been performed to determine the cross-linking structure of elastin, in an effort to better understand the relationship between elastin and pertinent diseases, such as cystic fibrosis, chronic obstructive pulmonary disease (COPD), and aortic aneurysms. A study was conducted to find this structure through synthesis of a cyclic peptide containing desmosine, to partially mimic elastin in the hopes of running mass spectrometry on the peptide to reveal the cross-linking structure. The elastin mimic was eventually synthesized successfully, and though work has not yet been done to clarify the cross-linking structure of elastin, preliminary mass spectrometry demonstrated the presence of the expected ion formed from the chemical reactions used.
