= Connective tissue disease =

Category of diseases

- Other names: Connective tissue disorder, collagen vascular diseases
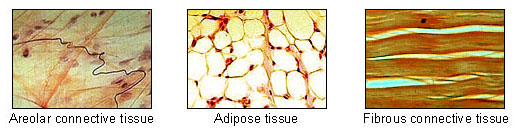
- Different types of connective tissue
- Specialty: Rheumatology

Connective tissue diseases (also termed connective tissue disorders, or collagen vascular diseases), are medical conditions that affect connective tissue.

Connective tissues protect, support, and provide structure for the body's other tissues and structures. They hold the body's structures together. Connective tissues consist of two distinct proteins: elastin and collagen. Tendons, ligaments, skin, cartilage, bone, and blood vessels are all made of collagen. Skin and ligaments also contain elastin. These proteins and the surrounding tissues may suffer damage when the connective tissues become inflamed.

The two main categories of connective tissue diseases are (1) a set of relatively rare genetic disorders affecting the primary structure of connective tissue, and (2) a variety of acquired diseases where the connective tissues are the site of multiple, more or less distinct immunological and inflammatory reactions.

Diseases in which inflammation or weakness of collagen tends to occur are also referred to as collagen diseases. Collagen vascular diseases can be (but are not necessarily) associated with collagen and blood vessel abnormalities that are autoimmune in nature.

Some connective tissue diseases have strong or weak genetic inheritance risks. Others may be due to environmental factors, or a combination of genetic and environmental influences.

== Classification ==
Connective tissue disease is an umbrella term for many different types of diseases. Connective tissue diseases can be classified into two groups:

1. a group of relatively rare genetic disorders affecting the primary structure of connective tissue;
2. a number of acquired conditions where the connective tissues are the site of multiple, more or less distinct immune and inflammatory reactions.

=== Heritable connective tissue disorders ===
Hereditary connective tissue disorders are a diverse set of broad, mostly single-gene disorders that impact one or more of the main components of connective tissues, such as ground substance (glycosaminoglycans), collagen, or elastin. Many result in anomalies of the skeleton and joints, which can substantially impair normal growth and development. In contrast to acquired connective tissue diseases, these conditions are uncommon.

- Marfan syndrome - inherited as an autosomal dominant characteristic, due to mutations in the FBN1 gene that encodes fibrillin 1.
- Homocystinuria - condition of methionine metabolism brought on by a cystathionine β-synthase deficit that causes a build-up of homocysteine and its metabolites in the urine and blood.
- Ehlers–Danlos syndrome - diverse collection of disorders distinguished by the fragility of soft connective tissues and widespread symptoms affecting the skin, ligaments, joints, blood vessels, and internal organs.
- Osteogenesis imperfecta - hereditary condition marked by reduced bone mass, weakened bones, increased brittleness, and short stature.
- Alkaptonuria - inborn error of metabolism caused by mutations in the HGO gene and homogentisate 1,2-dioxygenase deficiency.
- Pseudoxanthoma elasticum - rare multisystem disease marked by gradual calcification and fragmentation of elastic fibres.
- Mucopolysaccharidosis - a class of hereditary illnesses distinguished by the excretion of mucopolysaccharide in the urine.
- Fibrodysplasia ossificans progressiva - rare and debilitating hereditary disorder characterized by progressive heterotopic ossification and congenital skeletal malformations.
- Familial osteochondritis dissecans - separation of the subchondral bone and cartilage from the surrounding tissue.
- Stickler syndrome - autosomal dominant disorder distinguished by skeletal, ocular, and orofacial abnormalities.
- Alport syndrome - hereditary kidney disease is distinguished by structural abnormalities and malfunction in the glomerular basement membrane, as well as basement membranes in other organs such as the eye and ear.
- Congenital contractural arachnodactyly - autosomal dominant disorder defined by arachnodactyly, multiple flexion contractures, abnormal pinnae, severe kyphoscoliosis, and muscular hypoplasia.
- Epidermolysis bullosa - hereditary, diverse grouping of rare genetic dermatoses that are marked by blisters and mucocutaneous fragility.
- Loeys–Dietz syndrome - autosomal dominant condition linked to a wide range of systemic manifestations, such as skeletal, cutaneous, vascular, and craniofacial abnormalities.
- Hypermobility spectrum disorder - a variety of connective tissue diseases that are marked by ongoing pain and joint hypermobility.
- Arterial tortuosity syndrome - a rare connective tissue disorder distinguished by abnormal twisting of the large arteries. Other features include marfanoid habitus, keratoconus, hypotonia, and bowel dilatations and perforations.

=== Autoimmune connective tissue disorders ===
Acquired connective tissue diseases share certain clinical features, such as joint inflammation, inflammation of serous membranes, and vasculitis, as well as a high frequency of involvement of various internal organs that are particularly rich in connective tissue.

- Rheumatoid arthritis - autoimmune disease with an unclear cause that manifests as symmetric, erosive synovitis and, occasionally, extraarticular involvement.
- Systemic lupus erythematosus - chronic, complex autoimmune inflammatory disorder that can affect every organ in the body.
- Scleroderma and systemic scleroderma - diverse collection of autoimmune fibrosing conditions.
- Dermatomyositis and polymyositis - autoimmune myopathies that are clinically characterized by extramuscular symptoms, muscle inflammation, proximal muscle weakening, and oftentimes the detection of autoantibodies.
- Antisynthetase syndrome - multisystematic autoimmune disease associated with inflammatory myositis and interstitial lung disease.
- Vasculitis - disease that results in blood vessel inflammation.
- Sjögren's disease - a systemic autoimmune illness that mostly affects the exocrine glands and causes mucosal surfaces, especially those in the mouth and eyes, to become extremely dry.
- Rheumatic fever - multisystem inflammatory illness that develops after group A streptococcal pharyngitis.
- Amyloidosis - uncommon condition caused by protein mutations or changes in the body that result in twisted clusters of malformed proteins accumulating on organs and tissues.
- Osteoarthritis - common articular cartilage degenerative disease linked to hypertrophic bone abnormalities.
- Thrombotic thrombocytopenic purpura - uncommon and potentially fatal thrombotic microangiopathy characterized by severe thrombocytopenia, organ ischemia connected to diffuse microvascular platelet rich-thrombi, and microangiopathic hemolytic anemia.
- Relapsing polychondritis - uncommon multisystem autoimmune disease with an unclear etiology that is marked by progressive cartilaginous tissue loss and recurring episodes of inflammation.
- Mixed connective tissue disease - systemic autoimmune disease that shares characteristics with two or more other systemic autoimmune diseases, such as rheumatoid arthritis, polymyositis/dermatomyositis, systemic lupus erythematosus, and systemic sclerosis. It is an example of overlap syndrome.
- Undifferentiated connective tissue disease - unclassifiable systemic autoimmune disorders that do not meet any of the current classification requirements for connective tissue diseases, yet have clinical and serological signs similar to connective tissue diseases.
- Psoriatic arthritis - inflammatory musculoskeletal condition linked to psoriasis.
- Cryoglobulinemia - condition sometimes associated with systemic lupus erythematosus or rheumatoid arthritis in which there are abnormal proteins in the blood.
- IgG4-related disease - chronic inflammatory condition in which there is deposition of connective tissue (fibrosis) in different organs. Potentially life-threatening.
- Periaortitis - a group of rare vascular inflammatory diseases in which fibrous inflammatory tissue develops around the aorta or other structures such as the ureters. Sometimes associated with IgG4-related disease.
