= Snyder–Robinson syndrome =

- Other names: Spermine synthase deficiency
- Specialty: Medical genetics
- Symptoms: Intellectual disability, facial asymmetry, kyphoscoliosis, osteoporosis, hypotonia, asthenic build, seizures
- Usual onset: Adolescence, childhood, infancy
- Causes: Genetic
- Differential diagnosis: Glycerol kinase deficiency, Urban syndrome, Rett syndrome, cerebral palsy, Prader–Willi syndrome
- Frequency: <1 per 1,000,000

Snyder–Robinson syndrome (SRS) is an extremely rare inherited genetic disorder characterized by muscular and skeletal abnormalities, varying degrees of intellectual disability, seizures, and slow development.

SRS is caused by a mutated SMS gene at chromosome Xp21.3-p22.12, which carries instructions for producing the enzyme spermine synthase. Spermine synthase in turn helps the body produce spermine, a polyamine critical to cell processes such as cell division, tissue repair, and apoptosis. The resulting shortage of spermine in cells causes problems with development and brain function, though the exact mechanism is not understood.

The syndrome has also been referred to as Snyder–Robinson X-linked mental retardation syndrome (MRXSSR) and spermine synthase deficiency. SRS exclusively affects males. Only about ten families currently have a child with SRS, and 50 people have been diagnosed worldwide since 1969.

== Presentation ==
Snyder–Robinson usually is noticeable in infants, causing hypotonia and declining muscle tone with age. Seizures can occur in childhood, and children are especially susceptible to broken bones.

During early childhood, SRS causes mild to profound intellectual disability; speech difficulties; problems with walking; osteoporosis; marfanoid habitus; and scoliosis, kyphosis, or both (kyphoscoliosis). Distinctive facial features include a cleft palate, facial asymmetry, and a prominent lower lip. Kidney problems may also occur, such as nephrocalcinosis and renal cysts.

Other symptoms that frequently appear in patients with Snyder-Robinson syndrome include arachnodactyly, decreased muscle mass, disproportionately tall stature, long and narrow face, nasal speech, slender toe, and thick lower lip vermilion.

== Cause ==
SRS is a recessive X-linked condition. There are no known female cases, as both copies of the X chromosome would need to be mutated.

== Diagnosis ==
When SRS is suspected, doctors will order a molecular genetic test to confirm a mutation in the SMS gene—specifically a "hemizygous loss-of-function... pathogenic variant". However, there are currently no formal criteria for a diagnosis.

== Management ==
Individuals with Snyder–Robinson may be assisted by occupational therapy, physical or speech therapy. Anti-seizure medications such as carbamazepine, phenobarbital, and clobazam can be used to manage seizures—the medication used often is influenced by the type of seizure. Bone density can be determined via a DXA scan and may be improved with calcium supplements.

In 2014, several parents of individuals with SRS founded the Snyder–Robinson Foundation, a 501(c)(3) non-profit based in the US. It is a member of the National Organization for Rare Disorders.

== History ==
SRS was first reported in a 1969 paper published in Clinical Pediatrics by Russell D. Snyder and Arthur Robinson, who described the syndrome as "recessive sex-linked mental retardation in the absence of other recognizable abnormalities".
