= Dolichonychia =

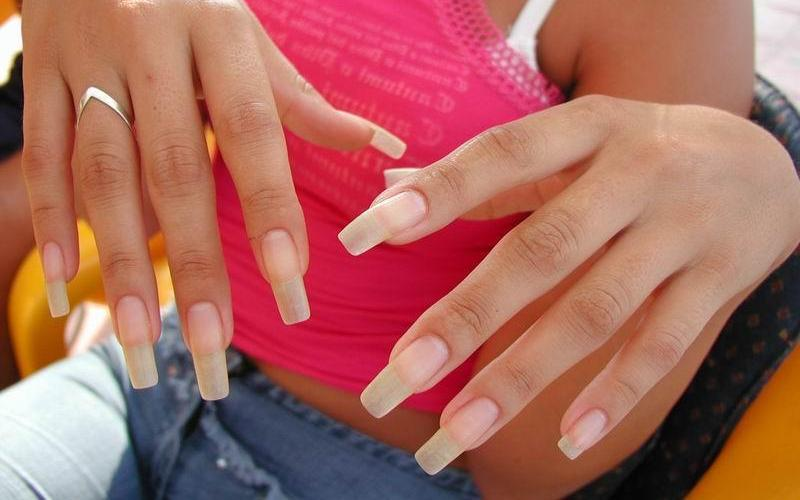
- Moderate dolichonychia of the nail beds combined with long free edges
- Specialty: Dermatology
- Complications: None, but it depends on which disorder it is possibly associated with
- Usual onset: Congenital
- Duration: Life-long
- Causes: The cause may vary among people with dolichonychia, in some, it is an isolated trait, in others, it might be a symptom of a connective tissue disorder, such as Marfan syndrome

Dolichonychia is a medical condition in which the nail beds of the fingers and toes are abnormally long and slender, specifically, a finger nail index of 1.30 or more, it is a common feature in people with connective tissue disorders, such as Ehlers–Danlos syndromes, Marfan syndrome, and hypohidrotic ectodermal dysplasia., it often appears alongside arachnodactyly and/or dolichostenomelia, which is the condition of having long and slender fingers and toes.

== See also ==
- Arachnodactyly
- Dolichostenomelia
- Marfan syndrome
- Ehlers–Danlos syndromes
