= Marfanoid =

Collection of signs that resemble Marfan syndrome

Marfanoid (or Marfanoid habitus) is a constellation of signs resembling those of Marfan syndrome, including long limbs, with an arm span that is at least 1.03 times the height of the individual, and a crowded oral maxilla, sometimes with a high arch in the palate, arachnodactyly, and hyperlaxity.

== Signs and symptoms ==
Arachnodactyly (long fingers), long limbs, scoliosis (curved spine), a hidden feature of bony lip growth towards vestibular aqueduct (which can be seen in CT scan reports), and imprecise articulation of speech due to high-arched palate are all considered Marfanoid symptoms. Language and cognition can be affected in neonatal Marfan syndrome where intellectual disability exists. Hearing may be impaired, either by conductive loss due to hypermobility of ossicles, by inflamed tympanic membrane, or sensorineurally through the vestibular aqueduct. In cases with hearing impairment, giddiness and imbalance may co-occur. Other symptoms include crowding of teeth and long or flat feet, often with hammer toes.

=== Associated conditions ===
Marfanoid habitus is a constellation of symptoms which are generally associated with other syndromes such as Ehlers–Danlos syndrome (including often being seen in the Hypermobile type), Perrault syndrome and Stickler syndrome. Associated conditions include:

- Multiple endocrine neoplasia type 2B
- Homocystinuria
- Ehlers–Danlos syndrome: Marfanoid habitus is generally associated with kyphoscoliotic Ehlers–Danlos.
- Snyder–Robinson syndrome at SMS, whose incidence is about 1 in 5,000-10,000 in all ethnic groups
- Perrault syndrome: Marfanoid habitus is a nonspecific feature of Perrault syndrome.

== Diagnosis ==
Medical diagnostic criteria to differentiate Marfanoid habitus from Marfan syndrome:

	Marfanoid habitus	Marfan syndrome
Arm span to height ratio	>1.03	>1.05
Scoliosis	>5°	>20°
