= Hypermobility (joints) =

Joints that stretch farther than normal

- Other names: hyperlaxity, benign joints hypermobility syndrome (BJHS), hypermobility syndrome (HMS)
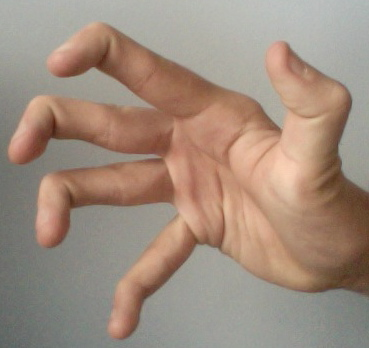
- Hypermobile fingers and thumb
- Specialty: Rheumatology, Medical genetics

Hypermobility, also known as double-jointedness, describes joints that stretch further than normal. For example, some hypermobile people can bend their thumbs backwards to their wrists, bend their knee joints backwards, put their leg behind the head, or perform other contortionist "tricks". It can affect one or more joints throughout the body.

Hypermobile joints are common and occur in about 10 to 25% of the population. Most have no other issues. In a minority of people, pain and other symptoms are present. In some cases, hypermobile joints are a feature of connective tissue disorders. One of these, Ehlers-Danlos Syndrome, was classified into several types which have been found to be genetic. Hypermobile Ehlers–Danlos syndrome (hEDS), formerly called EDS Type 3, remains the only EDS variant without a diagnostic DNA test.

In 2016, the diagnostic criteria for hEDS were re-written to be more restrictive, with the intent of narrowing the pool of hEDS patients, in the hope of making it easier to identify a common genetic mutation and create a diagnostic DNA test.

At the same time, joint hypermobility syndrome was renamed as hypermobility spectrum disorder, and redefined as a hypermobility disorder that does not meet the diagnostic criteria for any heritable Connective Tissue Disorder (such as hEDS, other types of Ehlers–Danlos Syndrome, Marfan Syndrome, Loeys–Dietz Syndrome, or osteogenesis imperfecta). Sometimes called "non-genetic EDS", hypermobility spectrum disorder can have the same signs as hEDS, though it can be caused not by a heritable genetic mutation, but by problems in fetal development, such as pre-natal exposure to toxins like agricultural chemicals, drugs, or alcohol. Fetal Alcohol Spectrum Disorders affect at least 1 in 20 people in the U.S., and joint hypermobility with other symptoms is common.

== Signs and symptoms ==
People with symptomatic joint hypermobility may develop complications as a result. These include:

- Dislocations or subluxations (that is, partial dislocations)
- Sprains, tendinitis, or bursitis from activities. However, a 2018 study reports that while hypermobile individuals are more likely to suffer dislocations doing sports than non-hypermobile individuals, they are less likely to suffer muscle and tendon sprains. The overall chances of sports injury are not significantly different.
- Joint pain
- Back pain
- Joints that make clicking noises
- Chance of nerve compression disorders in the joints (such as carpal tunnel syndrome)
- "Growing pains" (as described in children in late afternoon or night)

=== Associated conditions ===
Joint hypermobility may be associated with other conditions. These include ADHD, autism, dyspraxia, fibromyalgia, hereditary connective tissue disorders, mitral valve prolapse, and anxiety disorders such as panic disorder. Joint hypermobility does not cause these other conditions. Most people with joint hypermobility do not have them. In people who do, the underlying cause can be a general syndrome that affects the whole body and brain (such as Autism or Fetal Alcohol Spectrum Disorders), or a genetic condition or disease that affects certain tissues (such as Ehlers-Danlos syndrome or lupus). Hypermobility may be a risk factor for temporomandibular joint dysfunction.

== Causes ==
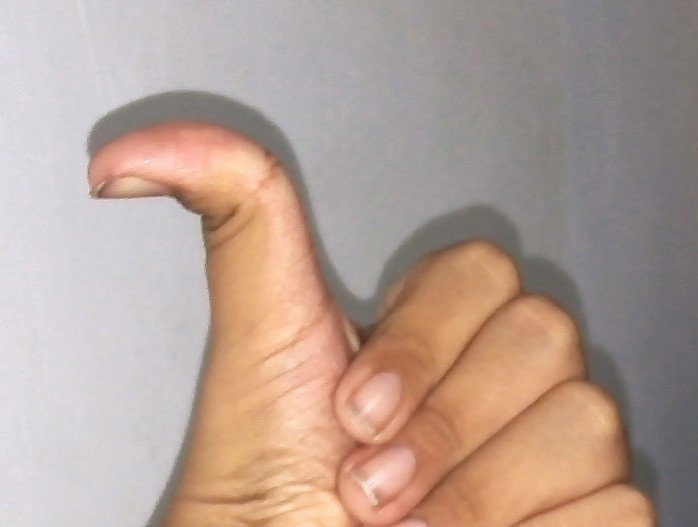
A hypermobile thumb (also called Hitchhiker's thumb)

Most people with hypermobile joints do not have a disorder causing it.

Hypermobility generally results from one or more of the following:

- Unusually-shaped ends of one or more bones where they form a joint, or an abnormally shallow angle of the bone, such as in coxa valga.
- A mutation in collagen or collagen-related genes (as found in certain types of Ehlers-Danlos syndrome) or other connective tissue (as found in Loeys–Dietz syndrome and Marfan syndrome) resulting in weakened ligaments/ligamentous laxity. Ligaments hold bones together at the joints.
- Abnormal joint proprioception (an impaired ability to locate body parts in space and/or monitor an extended joint)

Hypermobility tends to run in families, suggesting a genetic basis for at least some forms. The term double jointed is often used to describe hypermobility; however, the name is a misnomer and should not be taken literally, as people with hypermobile joints do not have any extra joints, or any extra bones or parts in the joint.

Symptoms are often exacerbated during pregnancy. During pregnancy, the body releases relaxin and certain hormones that alter ligament physiology, easing the stretching needed to accommodate fetal growth as well as the birthing process. The combination of hypermobility and pregnancy-related pelvic girdle during pregnancy can be debilitating. The pregnant woman with hypermobile joints may be in significant pain as muscles and joints adapt to the pregnancy. Pain makes standing or walking difficult during pregnancy, so some women who have one of these disorders find they need to use a wheelchair during pregnancy. They are also at risk for excessive bleeding during and after childbirth, and the baby is at risk of dislocated joints, especially of the clavicle, hip, and neck.

=== Syndromes ===
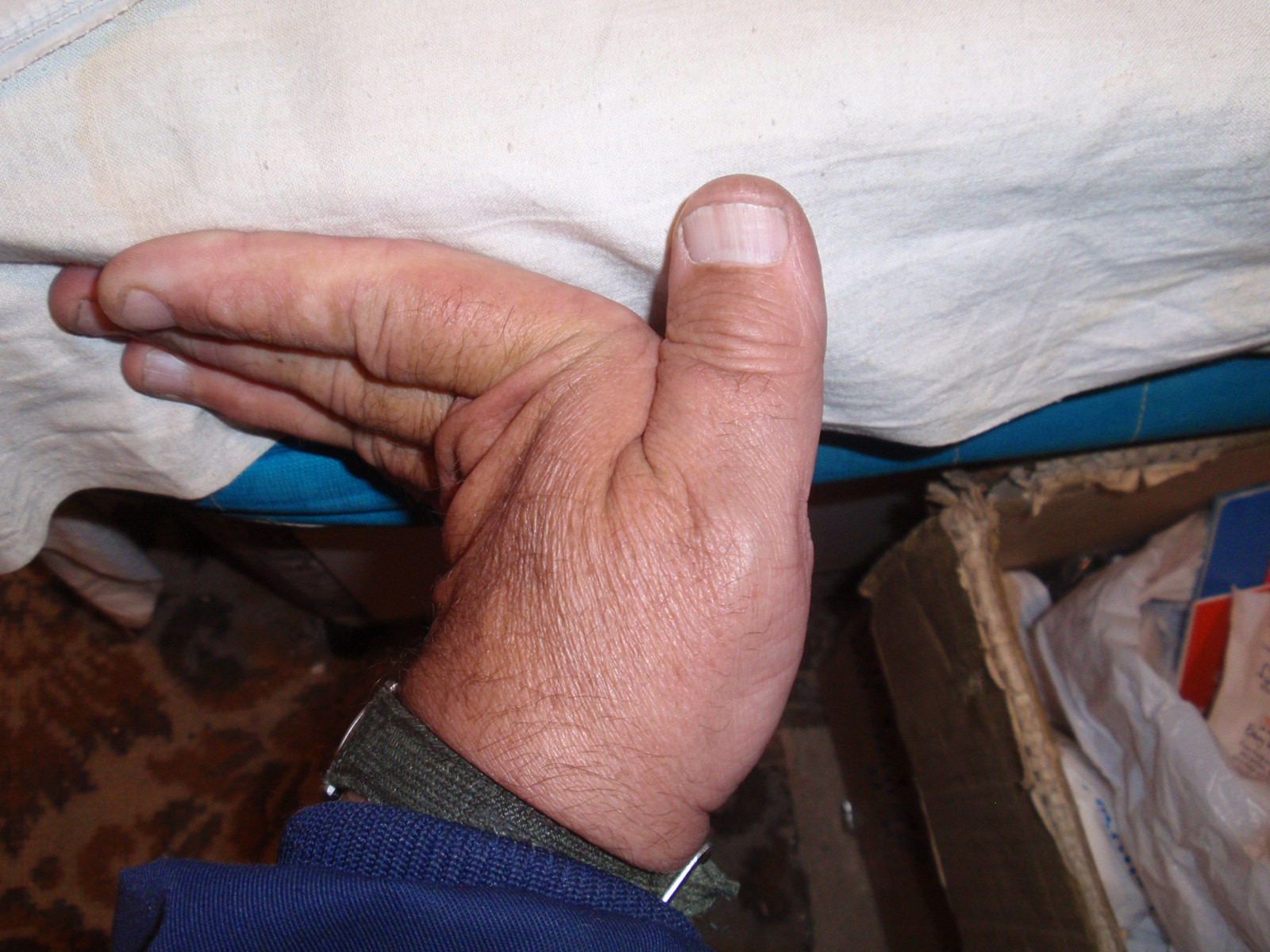
Hypermobile metacarpo-phalangeal joints

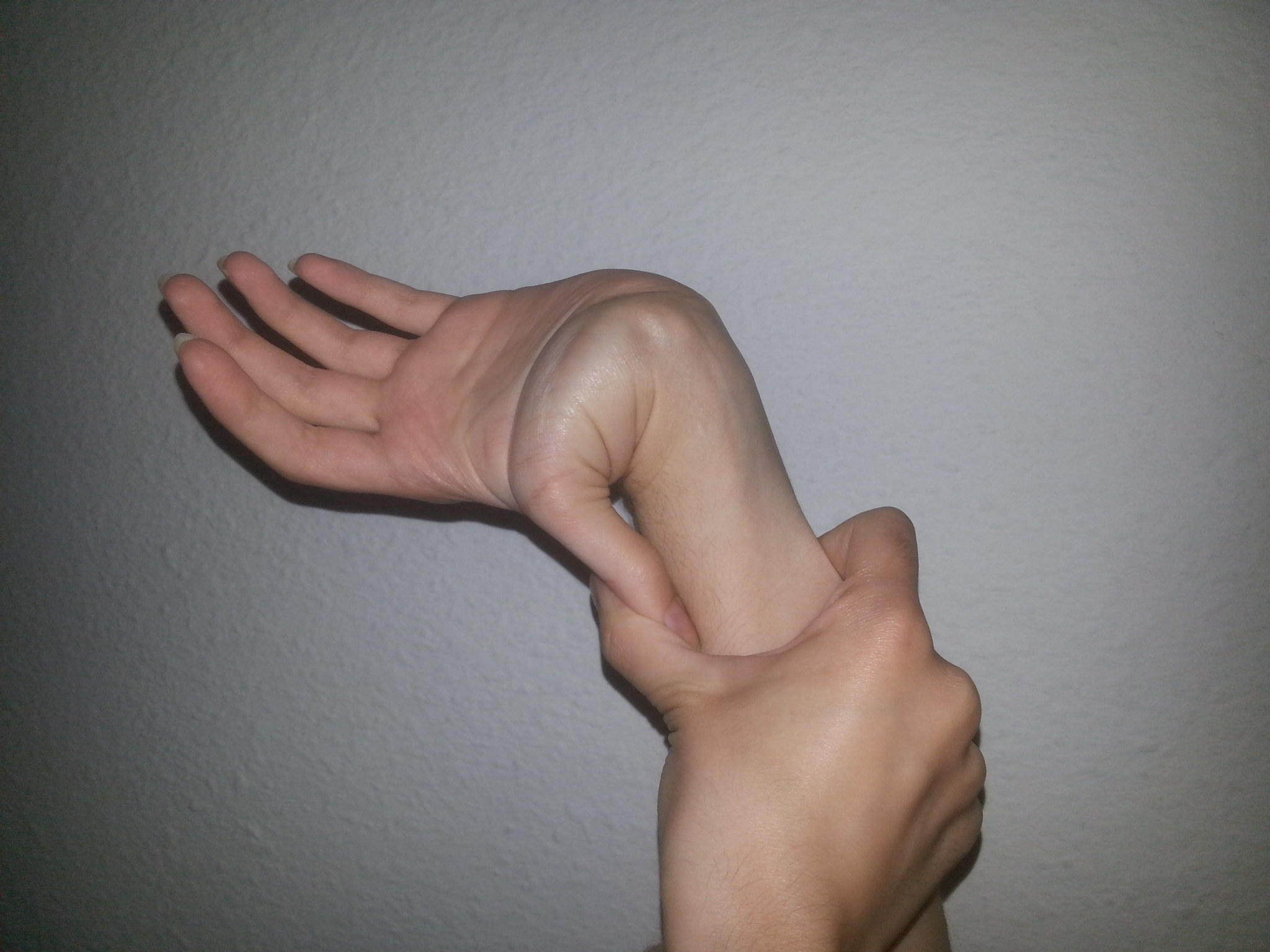
Hyperextension of the thumb

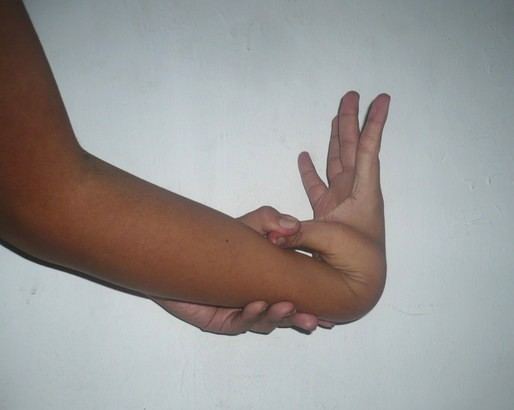
Hyperextension of the hand

Medical conditions that can cause joint hypermobility include FASDs, Stickler syndrome, Ehlers–Danlos syndrome, Marfan syndrome, Loeys–Dietz syndrome, rheumatoid arthritis, osteogenesis imperfecta, lupus, polio, Fragile X syndrome, Down syndrome, Morquio syndrome, cleidocranial dysostosis and myotonia congenita. All have other diagnostic criteria as well.

Current thinking suggests four causative factors:

- The shape of the ends of the bones — Some joints normally have a large range of movement, such as the shoulder and hip. Both are ball-and-socket joints. The joint ends of bones finish their growth last, so children tend to have more flexible joints than adults; children may "grow out of" hypermobility as their bone ends fully develop. A shallow socket will lead to a relatively large range of movement. If the hip socket is particularly shallow, then the hip may dislocate easily.
- Ligament problems— Ligaments are made of several types of protein fiber, including elastin and collagen. Gymnasts and athletes can voluntarily acquire hypermobility in some joints by stretching healthy ligaments over time. However, weak or abnormally long ligaments can cause unstable hypermobile joints. Protein deficiencies may weaken ligaments. Some hormones may alter the structure of collagen proteins. For example, in late pregnancy, relaxin allows the ligaments of the pelvis to lengthen so the head of the baby can pass.
- Muscle tone—Opposing sets of muscles are attached to bones to move joints in various directions. The tone of muscles—a mild basic level of contraction that protects joints and organs—is controlled by the nervous system. Neuromuscular problems can cause loss of muscle tone, increasing the range of movement possible and removing the muscles' protection of the joint. Lack of exercise also weakens the muscles that support and anchor highly flexible joints such as the shoulder, hip, wrist, and ankle.
- Proprioception—Disorders such as dyspraxia affect the brain's communication with the sensors that detect the motion and position of the body in space. A person with poor proprioception may habitually hyperextend joints during normal activities such as walking and sitting, because they can't internally sense where the joint is. If stress/pain perception is also affected, they may not experience hyperextension as uncomfortable until an injury occurs.

=== Ehlers–Danlos syndrome hypermobility type ===
Joint hypermobility is often correlated with hypermobile Ehlers–Danlos syndrome (hEDS, known also by EDS type III or Ehlers–Danlos syndrome hypermobility type (EDS-HT)). Ehlers–Danlos syndrome is a genetic disorder caused by mutations or hereditary genes, but the genetic defect that produces hEDS is largely unknown. In conjunction with joint hypermobility, a common symptom for hEDS is smooth, velvety, and stretchy skin. When diagnosing hEDS, the Beighton Criteria are used, but are not always able to distinguish between joint hypermobility syndrome and hEDS.

Ehlers–Danlos hypermobility type can have severe musculoskeletal effects, including:

- Jaw laxity that may make an individual's jaw open and close like a hinge, as well as open further than the average.
- Neck pain that can lead to chronic headaches and is usually associated with a crackling or grinding sensation (crepitus).
- The spine may end up in a "round back" or inversely may extend too much into hyperlordosis. Individuals may also experience scoliosis.
- Joints commonly associated with hypermobility (wrists, knees, ankles, elbows, shoulders) may be at more severe risk to dislocate or strain.

== Diagnosis ==
Joint hypermobility syndrome shares symptoms with other conditions such as Marfan syndrome and Ehlers-Danlos Syndrome. Hypermobility syndrome and Hypermobile Ehlers-Danlos syndrome are difficult to diffentiate, and the boundaries between them may be arbitrary. Hypermobility syndrome and hypermobile Ehlers-Danlos syndrome are both likely to have a variety of genetic causes. Generalized hypermobility is a common feature in hereditary connective tissue disorders and many features overlap, but often features are present that enable differentiating these disorders. Ehlers-Danlos Syndrome was defined based on its observable symptoms in the skin and joints.

The inheritance pattern of Ehlers-Danlos syndrome varies by type. The arthrochalasia, classic, hypermobility and vascular forms usually have an autosomal dominant pattern of inheritance. Autosomal dominant inheritance occurs when one copy of a gene in each cell is sufficient to cause a disorder. In some cases, an affected person inherits the mutation from one affected parent. Other cases result from new (sporadic) gene mutations. Such cases can occur in people with no history of the disorder in their family.

It is impossible to tell whether a person has EDS symptoms due to an inherited EDS gene, a spontaneous mutation that causes identical symptoms, or a problem in fetal development causes identical symptoms, without both knowing the genetic family history and performing a specialized genetic test. The results do not matter to clinical treatment of the symptoms.

The dermatosparaxis and kyphoscoliosis types of EDS and some cases of the classic and hypermobility forms, are inherited in an autosomal recessive pattern. In autosomal recessive inheritance, two copies of the gene in each cell are altered. Most often, both parents of an individual with an autosomal recessive disorder are carriers of one copy of the altered gene but do not show signs and symptoms of the disorder.

=== Beighton criteria ===
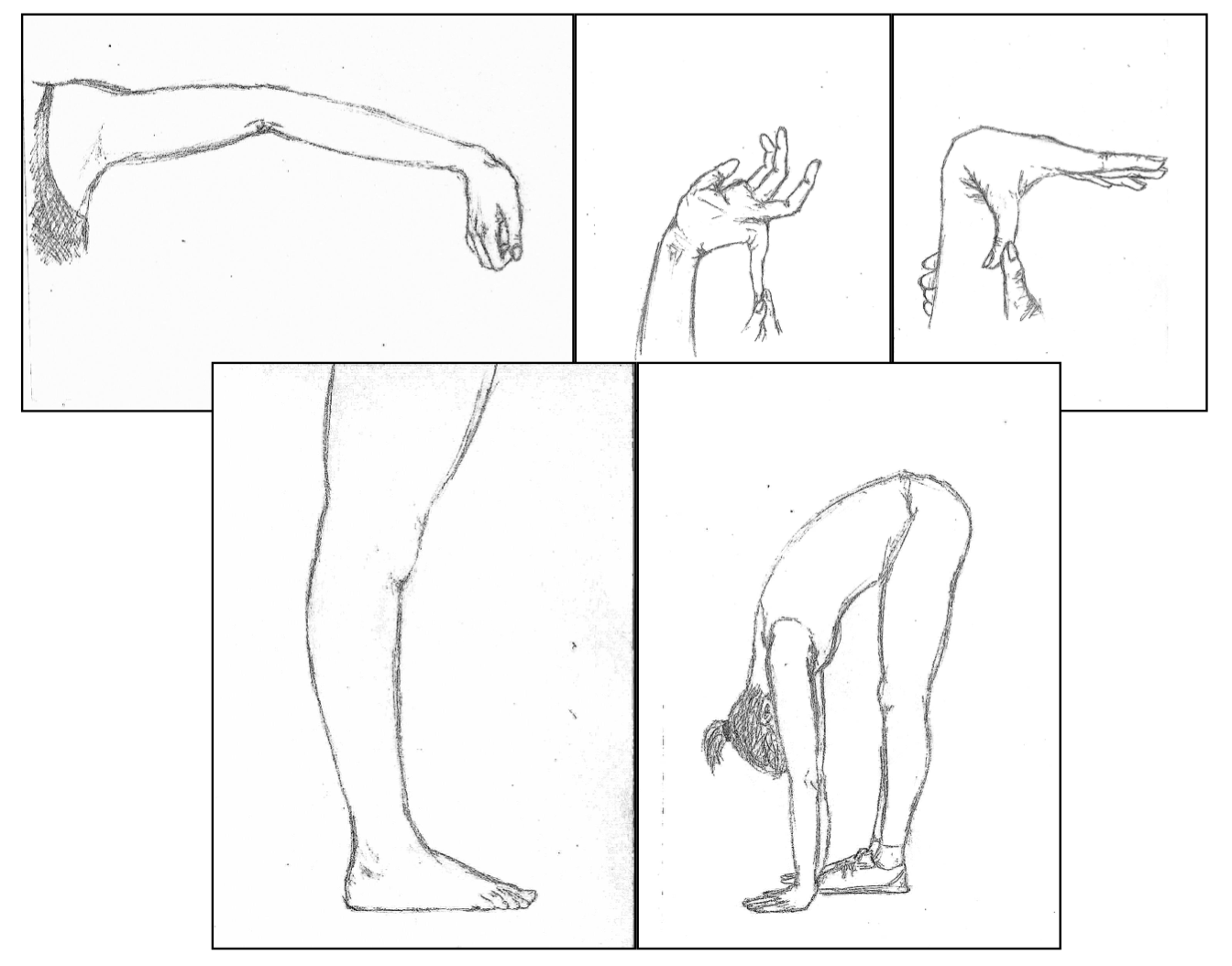
Beighton score criteria: one point for each elbow and knee that hyperextends by 10 degrees or more (4 points), one for each little finger that bends back by 90 degrees (2 points), one for each thumb which can be touched to the forearm (2 points), and one for touching the floor with the palms.

As of July 2000, hypermobility was diagnosed using the Beighton criteria. In 2017, the criteria changed, but still involve the Beighton score. The Beighton criteria do not replace the Beighton score but instead use the previous score in conjunction with other symptoms and criteria. HMS is diagnosed in the presence of either two major criteria, one major and two minor criteria, or four minor criteria. The criteria are:

==== Major criteria ====
- A Beighton score of 5/9 or more (either current or historic)
- Arthralgia for more than three months in four or more joints

==== Minor criteria ====
- A Beighton score of 1, 2 or 3/9 (0, 1, 2 or 3 if aged 50+)
- Arthralgia (> 3 months) in one to three joints or back pain (> 3 months), spondylosis, spondylolysis/spondylolisthesis.
- Dislocation/subluxation in more than one joint, or in one joint on more than one occasion.
- Soft tissue rheumatism. > 3 lesions (e.g. epicondylitis, tenosynovitis, bursitis).
- Marfanoid habitus (tall, slim, span/height ratio >1.03, upper: lower segment ratio less than 0.89, arachnodactyly; positive Steinberg finger / Walker wrist signs).
- Abnormal skin: striae, hyperextensibility, thin skin, papyraceous scarring.

=== Beighton score ===
The Beighton score is an edited version of the Carter/Wilkinson scoring system which was used for many years as an indicator of widespread hyper-mobility. Medical professionals varied in their interpretations of the results; some accepting as low as 1/9 and some 4/9 as a diagnosis of HMS. Therefore, it was incorporated, with clearer guidelines, into the Beighton Criteria. The Beighton score is measured by adding 1 point for each of the following:

- Placing flat hands on the floor with straight legs
- Left knee bending backward
- Right knee bending backward
- Left elbow bending backward
- Right elbow bending backward
- Left thumb touching the forearm
- Right thumb touching the forearm
- Left little finger bending backward past 90 degrees
- Right little finger bending backward past 90 degrees

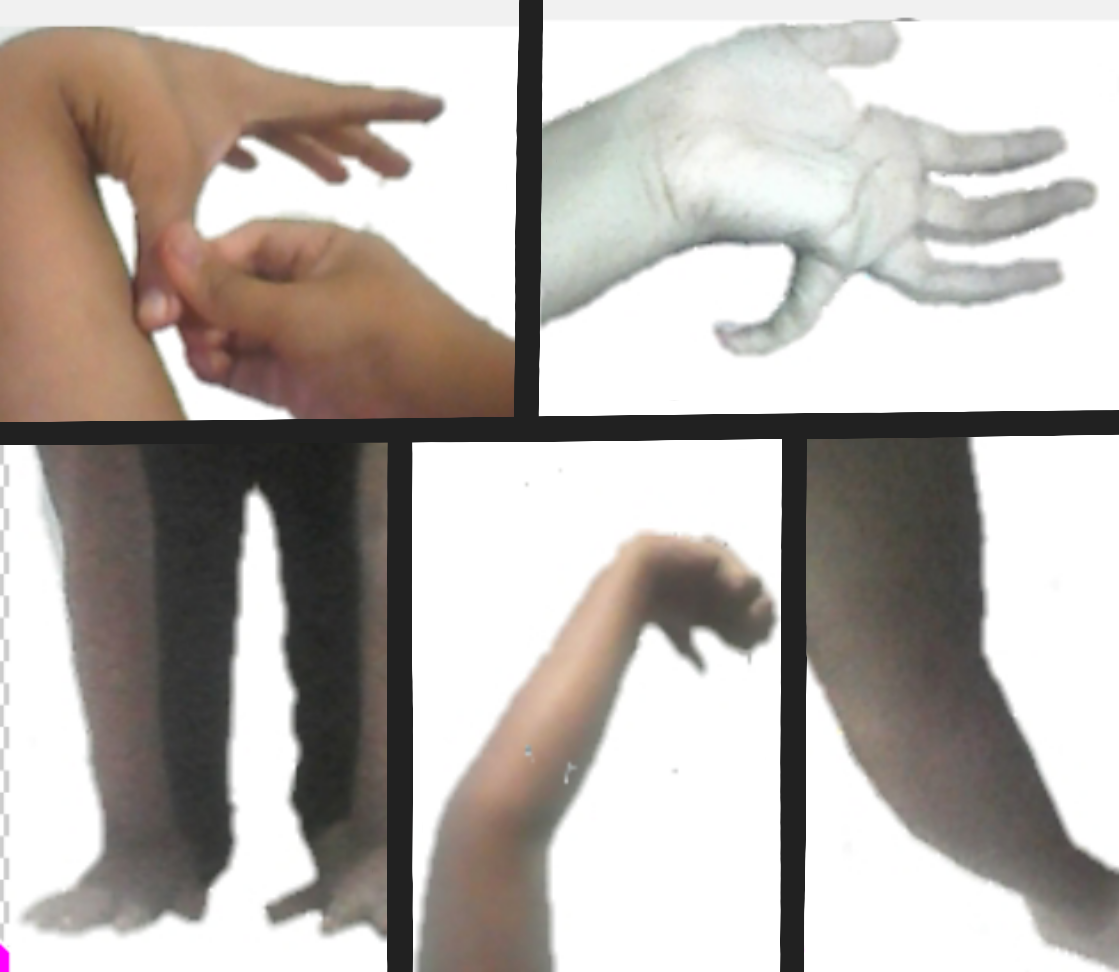
Beighton test in a person with a 9/9 score

The Beighton score has been widely used among athletes for screening purposes. It does not appear to be a valid scale when used for this purpose: there exists a statistically significant correlation between the score and the athlete's passive shoulder and hip ranges of motion, but the difference is small enough to be buried by measurement error.

== Treatments and management ==
=== Exercise ===
It is recommended that hypermobile individuals remain fit, to prevent pain and fatigue. Regular exercise and exercise that is supervised by a physician and physical therapist can reduce symptoms because strong muscles increase dynamic joint stability. Low-impact exercise such as closed kinetic chain exercises are usually recommended as they are less likely to cause injury when compared to high-impact exercise or contact sports. Hydrotherapy can also be a beneficial medium for muscle training. Some isometric exercises can also be beneficial. Coordination may be improved through balance exercises.

High impact sports are not recommended.

=== Medication ===
Medication is used in a similar way as for other chronic pain conditions, and can be used as a treatment for related joint pain. Nonsteroidal anti-inflammatory drugs and acetaminophen are used to treat pain. Opioids are often used, and prescribed for many with hypermobile Ehlers-Danlos syndrome.

=== Lifestyle modification ===
For some people with hypermobility, lifestyle changes decrease symptom severity. Regular movement is recommended, and support devices can be used. These include shaped keyboards to assist posture, insoles to support flat feet, and wide grip pens. Pillows and cushions can be used to support joints.

=== Other treatments ===
Bracing can be used for unstable joints, though it has weak evidence as a pain management strategy. Neuromuscular taping can help prevent injury. TENS units are sometimes used for pain relief. Heat and cold treatment can also help to relieve pain, and have no adverse effects.

== Epidemiology ==
Hypermobility occurs in about 10 to 25% of the population. It is reported more often in females than males. Hypermobile joints are also relatively common among children, though this is often benign.

== See also ==
- Ligamentous laxity
