= 3q29 microdeletion syndrome =

- Other names: 3qter deletion, Monosomy 3q29
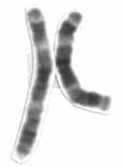
- Chromosome 3 is associated with this condition

3q29 microdeletion syndrome is a rare genetic disorder resulting from the deletion of a segment of chromosome 3. This syndrome was first described in 2005.

== Presentation ==
The clinical phenotype of 3q29 microdeletion syndrome is variable. Clinical features can include mild to moderate intellectual disability with mildly dysmorphic facial features (long and narrow face, short philtrum and a high nasal bridge). In six reported patients, additional features including autism, ataxia, chest-wall deformity and long, tapering fingers were found in at least two patients. A review of 14 children with interstitial deletions of 3q29, found 11 who had the common recurrent 1.6Mb deletion and displayed intellectual disability and microcephaly.

The variability of phenotype is underscored by the report on a 6 and 9/12 year-old male patient with a de novo chromosome 3q29 microdeletion identified by BAC array comparative genomic hybridization assay (aCGH), with accompanying normal 46,XY high-resolution chromosome analysis. The patient has language-based learning disabilities and behavioral features consistent with diagnoses of autism and attention deficit hyperactivity disorder (ADHD) of the inattentive type. He also displays some other features previously associated with chromosome 3q29 microdeletion such as an elongated face, long fingers, and joint laxity. Most notably the patient, per formal IQ testing, did not have an intellectual disability. The patient demonstrated an average full-scale IQ result. This is notable because previously reported patients with chromosome 3q29 terminal deletion had intellectual disabilities. This report further expands the phenotypic spectrum to include the possibility of normal intelligence as corroborated by formal, longitudinal psycho-educational testing.

== Research ==
Research on the risk for developing schizophrenia showed that 3q29 microdeletion syndrome leads to a significant higher rate of schizophrenia. In addition, a deletion at 3q29 was found to confer an increase to the odds of developing schizophrenia in a study of copy number variants and their effect on that disorder.

The 3q29 Project at Rutgers University is focused on understanding the phenotypic spectrum, natural history, and molecular mechanism of 3q29 deletion syndrome .

== Resources ==
Patient-centered information and resources are available through rarechromo.org and the 3q29 Foundation. Individuals with the 3q29 deletion who are interested in participating in research can join the 3q29 registry.
