= Reed E. Pyeritz =

American geneticist and academic (1947–2026)

- Born: Reed Edwin Pyeritz; November 2, 1947; Pittsburgh, Pennsylvania, U.S.
- Died: August 10, 2026 (aged 78); Bryn Mawr, Pennsylvania, U.S.
- Education: University of Delaware (S.B.), Chemistry, 1968; Harvard University (A.M.), Biological Chemistry, 1972; Harvard University (Ph.D.), Biological Chemistry, 1972; Harvard Medical School (M.D.), 1975
- Awards: David L. Rimoin Lifetime Achievement Award in Medical Genetics (2023)

Reed Edwin Pyeritz (November 2, 1947 – August 10, 2026) was an American medical geneticist, physician and academic. He was a professor of medicine and genetics at the Perelman School of Medicine at the University of Pennsylvania and was known for his research on Marfan syndrome and other inherited cardiovascular disorders, particularly diseases affecting the aorta. Pyeritz was one of the founders of the American College of Medical Genetics and Genomics and helped establish the Marfan Foundation. His research largely contributed to advances in the diagnosis and treatment of Marfan syndrome and to increased life expectancy among people with the disorder.

== Early life and education ==
Reed Edwin Pyeritz was born on November 2, 1947, in Pittsburgh, Pennsylvania, and raised in the suburb of Mt. Lebanon. He developed an early interest in science and space exploration. As a child, he built rockets in his backyard and conducted scientific experiments at home. His father had served in the United States Army Medical Corps during World War II, and his parents encouraged his interest in education and science.

After graduating from Mt. Lebanon High School, Pyeritz attended the University of Delaware, where he earned a S.B. in chemistry in 1968. He then attended Harvard University, earning an A.M. and Ph.D. in biological chemistry in 1972. He received his M.D. from Harvard Medical School in 1975.

== Medical and academic career ==
After completing his medical education and residency in internal medicine, Pyeritz pursued a career in medical genetics. He joined Johns Hopkins University, where he became a professor and began a research program focused on inherited cardiovascular disorders. His early work focused on Marfan syndrome, a genetic disorder of connective tissue that can cause enlargement and weakening of the aorta.

In 1979, while at Johns Hopkins, Pyeritz helped organize a support group for patients and families affected by Marfan syndrome. This group would eventually develop into the Marfan Foundation, an organization dedicated to research, education, and support for people with Marfan syndrome and related connective-tissue disorders.

In 1991, Pyeritz co-led a research team that identified mutations in the FBN1 gene, which encodes the protein fibrillin-1, as a cause of Marfan syndrome. The discovery provided a molecular basis for the disease and allowed more rapid and accurate diagnosis, particularly among families affected by the disorder. Pyeritz also led an early clinical trial demonstrating that beta blocker therapy could reduce the rate of enlargement of the aorta in people with Marfan syndrome and reduce the associated risk of aortic dissection. His research, together with subsequent work by other researchers, contributed to a substantial increase in life expectancy for people with Marfan syndrome.

Pyeritz joined the University of Pennsylvania as a professor of medicine in 2001. He served as chief of the Division of Medical Genetics at Penn Medicine from 2001 to 2011 and later became the inaugural William Smilow Professor of Medicine and Genetics at the Perelman School of Medicine. His research at Penn focused on Mendelian disorders of the cardiovascular system, particularly inherited disorders involving connective tissue and the aorta. He also studied the ethical, legal, and social implications of human genetics and genetic testing.

He served as chair of the University of Pennsylvania's Faculty Senate from 2015 to 2016. He was also involved in the development of the American College of Medical Genetics and Genomics, serving as one of its founders and later as its second president. He co-edited the medical reference work Principles and Practice of Medical Genetics and Genomics.

== Research and publications ==
Pyeritz's research focused primarily on hereditary cardiovascular diseases, particularly genetic disorders affecting the aorta. His work also addressed hereditary hemorrhagic telangiectasia and the genetic, ethical, and clinical implications of genetic testing.

Over the course of his career, Pyeritz published more than 700 research studies, reviews, and book chapters. His work appeared in major medical and genetics journals, including JAMA and Genetics in Medicine. His research and clinical work helped establish genetic testing and family screening as major components of the diagnosis and management of inherited cardiovascular disorders.

== Personal life and death ==
Pyeritz was married to Jane Tumpson, whom he had known since first grade. The couple had two daughters. Pyeritz died in Bryn Mawr, Pennsylvania on August 10, 2026, at the age of 78.

== Awards and recognition ==
Pyeritz received numerous honors for his contributions to medical genetics and the treatment of Marfan syndrome. In 2018, the Marfan Foundation presented him with its Hero with Heart Award, recognizing his decades of work on behalf of people with Marfan syndrome and related disorders.

In 2023, he received the David L. Rimoin Lifetime Achievement Award in Medical Genetics from the American College of Medical Genetics and Genomics Foundation. The award recognized his pioneering work on Marfan syndrome, his contributions to medical genetics, and his efforts to support patients and their families.
