= The Marfan Foundation =

US non-profit organization

- Founded: 1981
- Founder: Priscilla Ciccariello, Reed Pyeritz
- Purpose: Marfan syndrome
- Location: Port Washington
- Region served: United States
- Website: marfan.org

The Marfan Foundation (formerly National Marfan Foundation, NMF) is a non-profit organization in the United States established to raise awareness and promote research on treatment of Marfan syndrome and related disorders. The Foundation provides information about Marfan syndrome and funds research for the purposes of saving lives and improving the quality of life for people affected by the condition which is a genetic connective tissue disorder. The Foundation also lobbies Congress to fund Marfan syndrome research and engages in its own fundraising activities.

== History ==
The Foundation was established in 1981 by Priscilla Ciccariello, who lost a husband and son to the disorder, and Reed E. Pyeritz, MD, a geneticist at Johns Hopkins Hospital. In addition to providing grants for research on Marfan syndrome, the foundation raises awareness of the condition, which often goes undiagnosed, among health care providers and the public. The Foundation hosts an annual conference, has dozens of chapters and support groups across the U.S., and sponsors fundraising events. Carolyn Levering became the Marfan Foundation's first President and CEO in 1994. She announced her retirement in early 2014. Before it began using the current name, the organization was known as the National Marfan Foundation.

== Present day ==
The Marfan Foundation operates under the guidance of its board of directors, which consists of "a diverse group of business leaders and long-time Foundation members." The Foundation also has a Professional Advisory Board consisting of physicians and other health care professionals, and is currently chaired by Alan C. Braverman, MD, of Washington University School of Medicine. The Marfan Foundation has a separate Scientific Advisory Board, currently chaired by Craig T. Basson, MD, PhD of Novartis Institutes for Biomedical Research. The late geneticist Victor A. McKusick was also a member of the Foundation's Scientific Advisory Board.

In February 2020, The Walk for Victory, a series of annual national walks which benefits The Marfan Foundation, raises awareness and funds for Marfan syndrome. The walk was held on February 29 at TeWinkle Park in Costa Mesa, Southern California, and on February 9 at T.Y. Park in Hollywood, Florida.

== See also ==
- Marfan syndrome
- Connective tissue disease
