= Congenital contractural arachnodactyly =

- Other names: Beals syndrome; Beals–Hecht syndrome; Arachnodactyly, contractural Beals type; multiple with arachnodactyly; Ear anomalies-contractures-dysplasia of bone with kyphoscoliosis; Distal arthrogryposis type 9
- Symptoms: Tall, slender body; arm span exceeds height; long, slender fingers and toes; kyphoscoliosis; crumpled ear; joint stiffness
- Usual onset: Conception
- Causes: Mutation of FBN2 gene
- Treatment: Physical therapy for joint contractures; bracing and/or surgical correction for kyphoscoliosis
- Prognosis: Life expectancy depends on severity of symptoms but typically it is not shortened

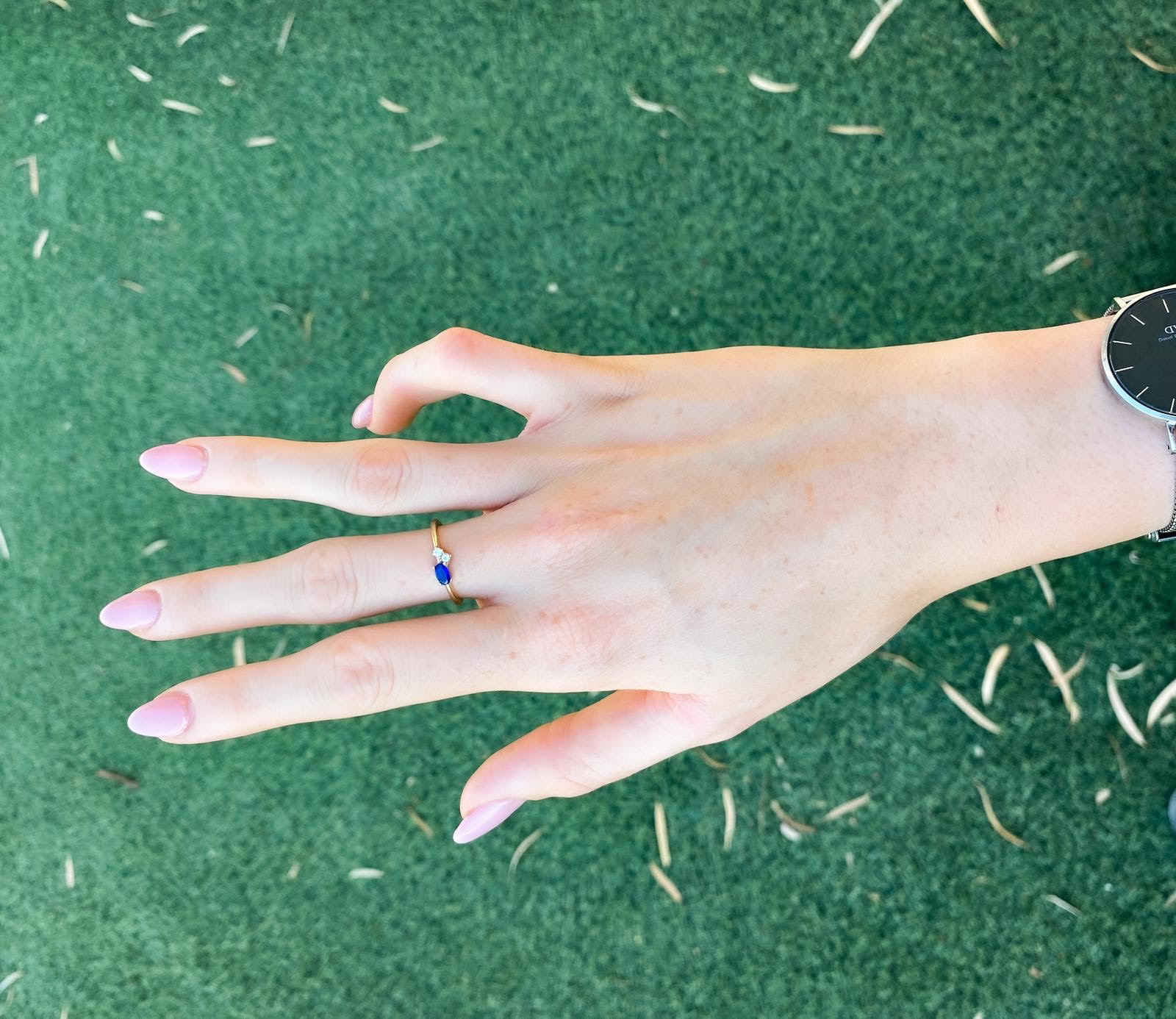
Beals Hecht syndrome hand

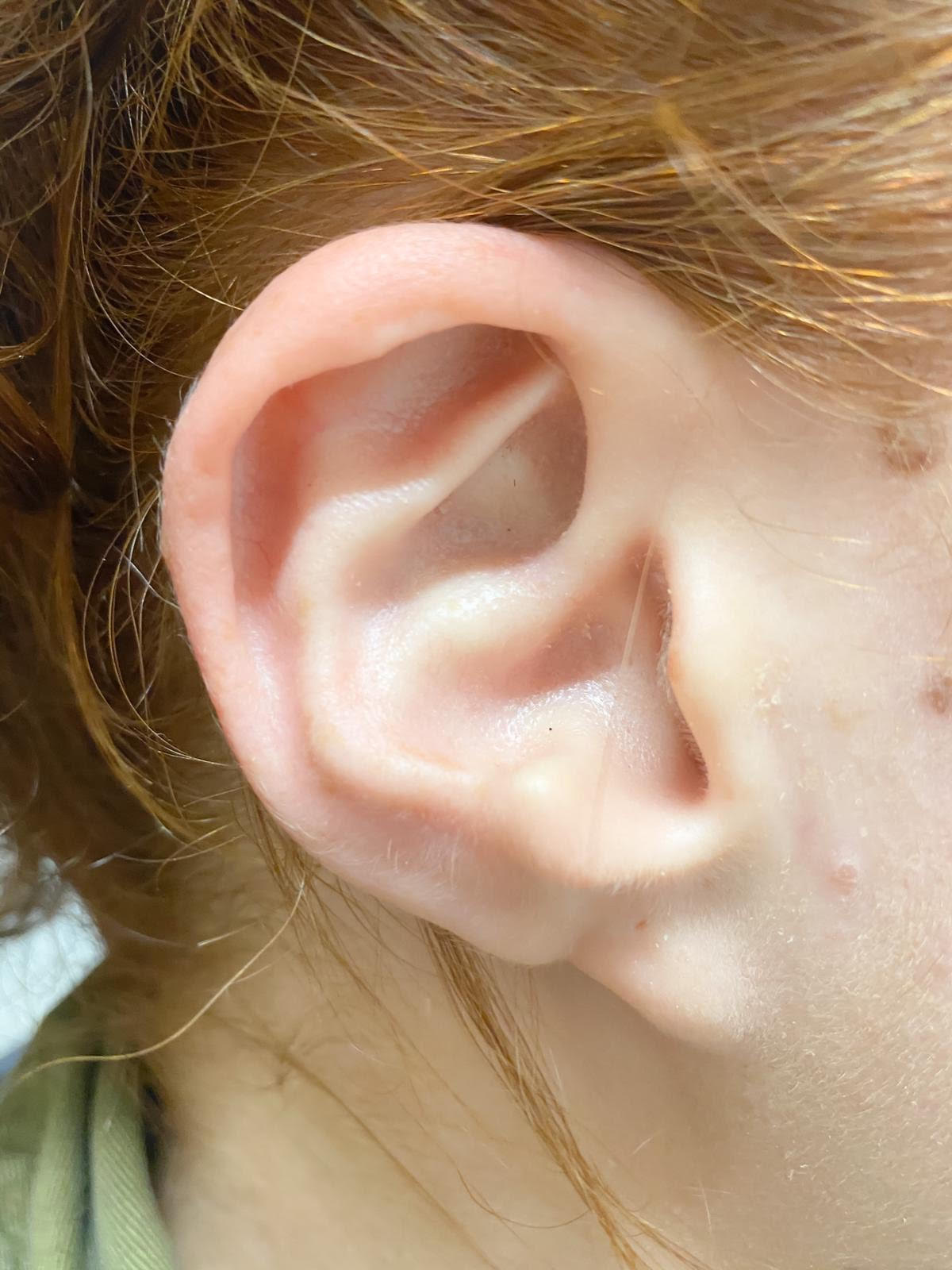
Ear of individual with Beals Syndrome.

Congenital contractural arachnodactyly (CCA), also known as Beals–Hecht syndrome, is a rare autosomal dominant congenital connective tissue disorder. As with Marfan syndrome, people with CCA typically have an arm span that is greater than their height and very long fingers and toes. However, Beals and Hecht discovered in 1972 that, unlike Marfan's, CCA is caused by mutations to the fibrillin-2 (FBN2) gene rather than the fibrillin-1 (FBN1) gene.

== Signs and symptoms ==
Signs and symptoms of CCA often resemble those of Marfan syndrome, despite the two syndromes' different causes. CCA is characterized by contractures of varying degrees, mainly involving the large joints, which are present in all affected children at birth. The contractures may be mild and tend to improve over time, but permanently bent fingers and toes (camptodactyly) are almost always present. In addition to long fingers and toes (arachnodactyly) and a tall, slender body, people with CCA often have ears that appear to be crumpled (a key distinguishing feature from Marfan syndrome), joint stiffness and underdeveloped muscles (muscular hypoplasia), and they may have curved spines (congenital kyphoscoliosis). If kyphoscoliosis is present, it often becomes progressively worse and may require surgery. In some cases, the blood vessel that distributes blood from the heart to the rest of the body (aorta) may be abnormally enlarged (aortic root dilatation).

== Causes ==
Congenital contractural arachnodactyly may be the result of new mutations in the FBN2 gene, located on chromosome 5q23, or it may be inherited from a parent in an autosomal dominant pattern, which means one copy of the altered gene in each cell is sufficient to cause the disorder.

Congenital contractural arachnodactyly is inherited in an autosomal dominant pattern.

== Diagnosis ==
CCA may be diagnosed through the physical characteristics associated with the disease of long, slender body and contractures of multiple joints, as well as other symptoms, such as muscular hypoplasia. Molecular genetic tests may be run using sequence analysis or deletion/duplication analysis to look for mutations in the FBN2 gene. Prenatal testing may be used for pregnancies with a risk of CCA, such as a parent or sibling with the disease.

== Epidemiology ==
An estimate of the prevalence of congenital contractural arachnodactyly is not known at this time.

== Management ==
Joint contractures are treated using physical therapy to increase mobility and to improve the effects of underdeveloped muscles. Braces and/or surgery may be required to correct kyphoscoliosis. Children born with CCA are usually tested using echocardiograms every two years until the risks of an enlarged aorta (aortic root dilation) have been ruled out. If this is detected, it is managed with standard care for this condition. It is also recommended that patients with CCA get ophthalmologic exams routinely.

== Prognosis ==
Life expectancy may be affected by the disease symptoms present but it is not usually shortened for those with this disease.

== See also ==
- Congenital contractural arachnodactyly in cattle
