= Protrusio acetabuli =

- Specialty: Orthopedics

Protrusio acetabuli is an uncommon defect of the acetabulum, the socket that receives the femoral head to make the hip joint. The hip bone of the pelvic bone/girdle is composed of three bones, the ilium, the ischium and the pubis. In protrusio deformity, there is medial displacement of the femoral head in that the medial aspect of the femoral cortex is medial to the ilioischial line. The socket is too deep and may protrude into the pelvis.

== Signs and symptoms ==
Protrusio acetabuli may be asymptomatic. Limitation of joint range of movement is the earliest sign, along with pain.

== Classification ==
Protrusio acetabuli is divided into two types, primary and secondary.

- Primary protrusio acetabuli, congenital protrusion of the acetabuli into the pelvis, making a elongated space for the femoral head, disrupting the smooth joint, is characterized by pain, restricted mobility of the hipjoint, often symptomatic from the early teens. Unusual, more prevalent in women. It may be familial.
- Secondary protrusio acetabuli's causes include femoral head, cup, septic arthritis, central fracture dislocation.

Protrusio acetabuli may also be thought of as unilateral or bilateral.

- Unilateral protrusio acetabuli may be caused by tuberculous arthritis, trauma, or fibrous dysplasia.
- Primary Bilateral protrusio acetabuli is genetic. Secondary protrusion, bilateral, may be caused by rheumatoid arthritis, Paget's disease, osteomalacia, Marfan syndrome, and ankylosing spondylitis.

== Prognosis ==
The protrusio may progress until the femoral neck impinges against the pelvis.

== Treatment ==
Arthroscopic surgery (or open joint surgery) is an effective treatment. Joint replacement surgery may be necessary in the case of severe pain or substantial joint restriction.
