= Collagen disease =

- Specialty: Rheumatology

Collagen disease is a term previously used to describe systemic autoimmune diseases (e.g., rheumatoid arthritis, systemic lupus erythematosus, and systemic sclerosis), but now is thought to be more appropriate for diseases associated with defects in collagen, which is a component of the connective tissue.

The term "collagen disease" was coined by Dr. Alvin F. Coburn in 1932, on his quest to discover streptococcal infection as the cause for rheumatic fever.

== See also ==
- Collagenopathy, types II and XI
- Connective tissue disease
