= Dural ectasia =

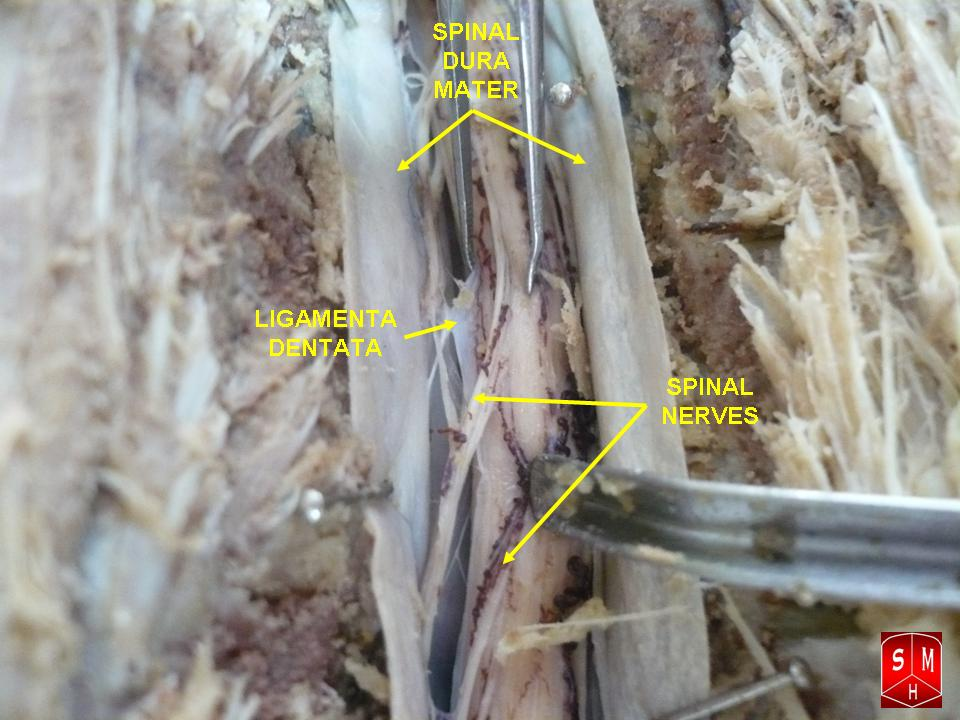
- Spinal cord
- Specialty: Neurology

Dural ectasia is widening or ballooning of the dural sac surrounding the spinal cord. This usually occurs in the lumbosacral region, as this is where the cerebrospinal fluid pressure is greatest, but the spinal canal can be affected in any plane.

== Signs and symptoms ==
Common symptoms include lower back pain, headaches, weakness (myasthenia), numbness (hypoesthesia) above and below the involved limb, leg pain, and sometimes rectal and genital pain. Bowel and bladder dysfunction, urinary retention or incontinence may occur. Moderate-to-severe cases can cause radicular pain in the legs caused by nerve root compression.

The symptoms are usually exacerbated by upright posture and often, but not always, relieved by lying down. Postural headaches can be related to spontaneous spinal cerebrospinal fluid leaks. However, in many patients, dural ectasia is asymptomatic.

== Causes ==
The etiology of dural ectasia is unknown, but it has been suggested that is due to increased hydrostatic pressure, general weakened connective tissue or as a result of the pulsatile flow of cerebrospinal fluid on weakened spinal dura.

Dural ectasia is common in Marfan syndrome, occurring in 63–92% of people with the syndrome. It may also occur in Ehlers–Danlos syndrome, neurofibromatosis type I, ankylosing spondylitis, and is associated with spondylolisthesis, vertebral fractures, scoliosis, tumors or trauma.

In neurofibromatosis type I, it has been theorized that local infiltration of the dura by plexiform neurofibromas leads to a weakening of the dural allowing the outpouching. A retrospective study found that a majority of dural ectasia were associated with nearby plexiform neurofibromas.

== Diagnosis ==
Dural ectasia is defined as a ballooning or outpouching of the dura with a dural volume greater than two standard deviations above the mean value in controls. It is usually identified by MRI or CT scan, which can be used to distinguish it from tumors. Radiographs may also be used to identify secondary bone changes. Associated signs include a lack of epidural fat at the posterior wall of the vertebral body, the presence of radicular cysts, anterior meningoceles, nerve root sleeve herniation and gradual erosion of the vertebral bodies (scalloping).

== Treatment ==
Dural ectasia can be asymptomatic, in which case no intervention is necessary. However, it is associated with chronic pain in patients with Marfan syndrome, suggesting it is a structural risk factor. There is no medical consensus on how to manage symptomatic (painful) dural ectasia. The majority of patients are treated conservatively with pain control medications, physiotherapy, and other physical modalities, with often incomplete control of patients' pain. Surgical repair of the dura may provide symptomatic relief for some patients.

It has been reported that acetazolamide can be used to treat dural ectasia in individuals with Marfan syndrome, however, the only supporting evidence for this assertion is a small study of 14 patients which was not peer-reviewed or submitted for publication. Moreover, several published cases of intracranial hypotension related to Marfan syndrome would warrant caution in using acetazolamide in these patients unless there is a clear indication, as it could lower intracranial pressure further.
