= Congenital contractural arachnodactyly in cattle =

Genetic disorder of cattle

Congenital contractural arachnodactyly (CA), also known as fawn calf syndrome, is an autosomal recessive genetic disorder in cattle. The disorder affects the connective tissue of muscles, leading to contracture of the upper limb (most obvious in the hind limbs), and laxity of the joints of the lower limbs. CA affects Angus cattle, and associated breeds such as Murray Greys. The mutation which causes this defect is a deletion on bovine chromosome 21.

== Clinical signs ==
Affected calves are usually born alive with normal body weight, and most can walk and suckle, although 20 percent cannot suckle and die soon after birth. Signs include proximal limb contracture, congenital distal limb hyperextension and congenital kyphosis. As the calf grows, signs significantly improve. In mildly affected calves, CA may be less obvious, presenting as tall stature, joint laxity and poor muscling. Joint laxity predisposes affected cattle to the early onset of arthritis.

== Prevention ==
In Australia, affected animals are descended from Freestate Barbara 871 of Kaf, a cow born in Indiana, US, in 1978. This cow is an ancestor of approximately half of all Angus cattle in Australia, limiting the usefulness of pedigree analysis in identifying potential carriers. If CA is identified in a herd, bulls that have tested negative for CA should be purchased, since both parents must be carriers of the defective gene for affected calves to be born. Angus sires which carry CA include Rambo 465T of JRS, Te Mania Kelp K207, Bon View Bando 598, SAF 598 Bando 5175 and Boyd On Target 1083.

== History ==
The disorder was first identified in Victoria, Australia in 1998, and has since been identified in other countries. A genetic test was developed in 2010.
