= Arachnodactyly =

Spider fingers

- Other names: Achromachia
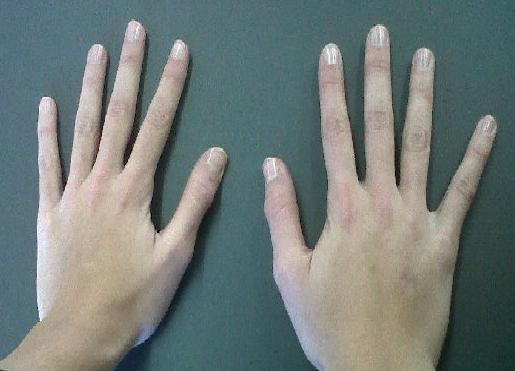
- Bilateral arachnodactyly with abnormally long and slender fingers
- Specialty: Medical genetics
- Complications: None
- Usual onset: Birth
- Duration: Life-long
- Causes: Mutations in the fibrillin-2 gene, in chromosome 5q23, or the fibrillin-1 gene, at chromosome 15q21.1

Arachnodactyly ("spider fingers") is a medical condition that is characterized by fingers and toes that are abnormally long and slender, in comparison to the palm of the hand and arch of the foot. In some cases, the thumbs of a person affected by the condition are pulled inwards towards the palm. This condition is present at birth.

== Causes ==
This feature can occur on its own with no underlying health problems, or it can be associated with certain medical conditions, including but not limited to Marfan syndrome, Ehlers–Danlos syndromes, Loeys–Dietz syndrome, and homocystinuria. It is also seen in congenital contractural arachnodactyly, which is caused by mutation in the gene encoding fibrillin-2 on chromosome 5q23.

== Notable individuals ==
It remains unconfirmed whether Russian composer and pianist Sergei Rachmaninoff's abnormally large reach on a piano was due to arachnodactyly from Marfan syndrome, as the pianist exhibited no other signs of the disease.

Italian violinist and composer Niccolò Paganini also had abnormally long and slender fingers. Although there is no definitive medical proof, he might have been affected by Marfan syndrome or Ehlers–Danlos syndrome.

== See also ==
- Marfanoid
