= Narrow face =

- Other names: Narrow facies
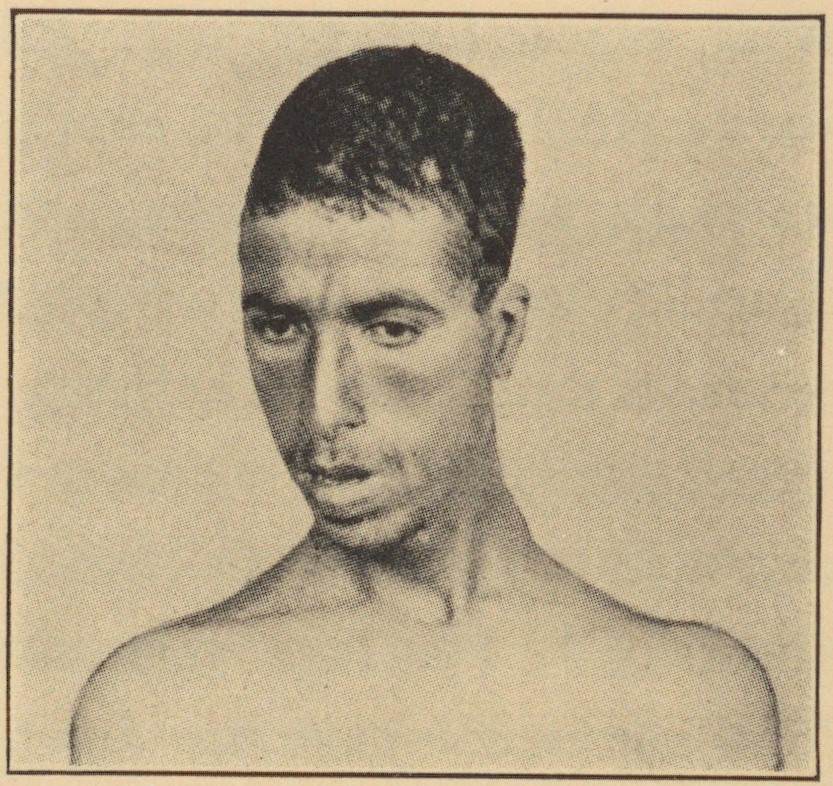
- Narrow face and acroephalus in congenital syphilis

Narrow face is a dysmorphic feature in which its width is abnormally reduced (upper and lower face width less than 2 SD below the mean subjectively, or apparent reduction of the width of the upper and lower face objectively).

== Syndromes (conditions) ==
Narrow face is seen in the following conditions and syndromes:

- 5p partial monosomy syndrome
- Bloom syndrome
- Branchiootorenal syndrome 1
- Cardiofaciocutaneous syndrome 4
- Christianson syndrome
- Congenital disorder of glycosylation, type IIw
- Congenital myasthenic syndrome 2A
- Congenital myopathy 4A, autosomal dominant
- Congenital myopathy 4B, autosomal recessive
- Creatine transporter deficiency
- Cutis laxa, X-linked
- Ehlers-Danlos syndrome, Beasley-Cohen type
- Granulocytopenia with immunoglobulin abnormality
- Hereditary spastic paraplegia 23 and 51
- Intellectual disability, autosomal recessive 5
- Intellectual disability, X-linked 107, 58, and 61
- Knobloch syndrome
- Marfan syndrome
- Mitochondrial DNA depletion syndrome 13
- Nance-Horan syndrome
- Oculofaciocardiodental syndrome
- Otofaciocervical syndrome 1
- Proximal myopathy with extrapyramidal signs
- Radioulnar synostosis-developmental delay-hypotonia syndrome
- Renpenning syndrome
- Seckel syndrome 9
- Severe X-linked myotubular myopathy
- SIN3A-related intellectual disability syndrome due to a point mutation
- Symphalangism-brachydactyly syndrome
- Syndromic X-linked intellectual disability 14
- Torsion dystonia 4
- X-linked intellectual disability with marfanoid habitus
- XFE progeroid syndrome

== See also ==
- Facial bones
- Scaphocephaly
