= High-arched palate =

Congenital anomaly

- Specialty: Medical genetics

A high-arched palate (also termed high-vaulted palate) is where the palate is unusually high and narrow. It is usually a congenital developmental feature that results from the failure of the palatal shelves to fuse correctly in development, the same phenomenon that leads to cleft palate. It may occur in isolation or in association with a number of conditions. It may also be an acquired condition caused by chronic thumb-sucking. A high-arched palate may result in a narrowed airway and sleep disordered breathing.

Examples of conditions which may be associated with a high-arched palate include:

- Allergic rhinitis
- Apert syndrome
- Crouzon syndrome
- Down syndrome
- Ehlers–Danlos syndrome
- Friedreich's ataxia
- Fragile X syndrome
- Incontinentia pigmenti
- Marfan syndrome
- Sotos syndrome
- Treacher Collins syndrome
- Upper airway resistance syndrome

== See also ==
- Minor physical anomalies
- Bardet–Biedl syndrome
