= SMS (gene) =

Protein-coding gene in the species Homo sapiens

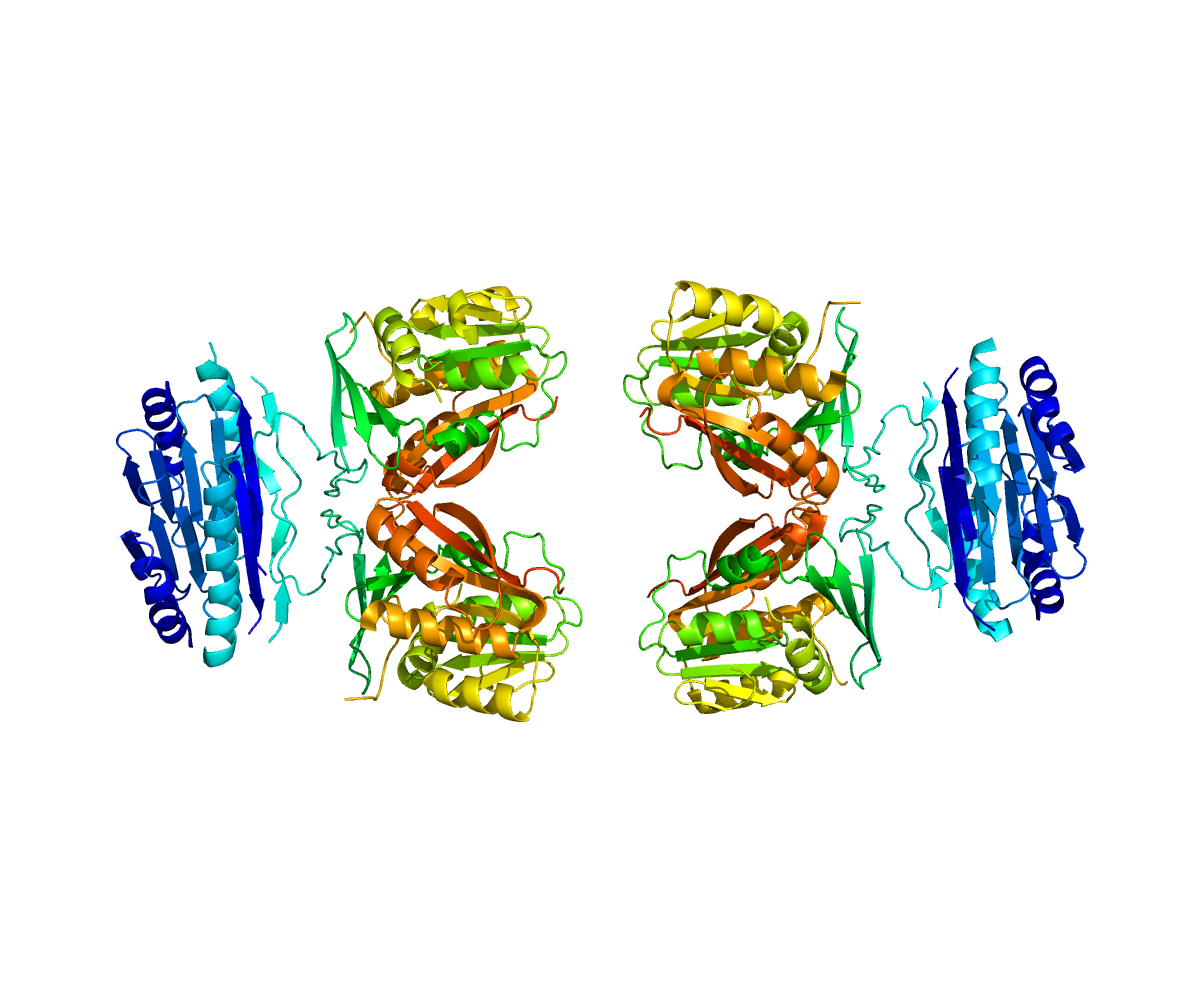

Identifiers
- Aliases: SMS, MRSR, SPMSY, SRS, SpS, spermine synthase, MRXSSR
- External IDs: OMIM: 300105; MGI: 3705601; GeneCards: SMS
Available structures
PDB	Ortholog search: PDBe RCSB
PDB	List of PDB id codes 3C6K, 3C6M
Enzyme activity
EC #	BRENDA	ExPASy	KEGG	MetaCyc
2.5.1.22	↗	↗	↗	↗

Gene location (Human)
Chr.	X chromosome (human)
Band	Xp22.11	Start	21,940,709 bp
Band	Xp22.11	End	21,994,837 bp
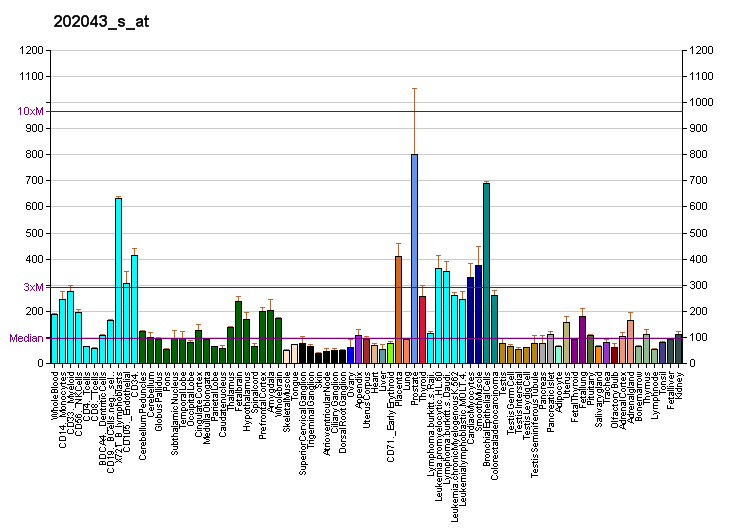
RNA expression pattern
Bgee	Human / Mouse (ortholog); Top expressed in: placenta; ganglionic eminence; right adrenal cortex; left adrenal gland; left adrenal cortex; human kidney; endometrium; ventricular zone; islet of Langerhans; ovary / n/a; More reference expression data
BioGPS	More reference expression data
Gene ontology
Molecular function	transferase activity; spermine synthase activity
Cellular component	cytosol; extracellular exosome
Biological process	spermine biosynthetic process; spermine metabolic process; polyamine biosynthetic process; methionine metabolic process; polyamine metabolic process
Sources:Amigo / QuickGO
Orthologs
Databases	NCBI: entry; OMA: entry
Species	Human	Mouse
Entrez	6611	671878
Ensembl	ENSG00000102172	n/a
UniProt	P52788	P97355
RefSeq (mRNA)	NM_001258423; NM_004595	XM_001473434
RefSeq (protein)	NP_001245352; NP_004586	NP_033240; NP_001346114
Location (UCSC)	Chr X: 21.94 – 21.99 Mb	n/a
PubMed search
- Wikidata
View/Edit Human	View/Edit Mouse

SMS is a gene that encodes the enzyme spermine synthase in humans. The protein encoded by this gene belongs to the spermidine/spermine synthases family. This gene encodes a ubiquitous enzyme of polyamine metabolism.
