= Loeys–Dietz syndrome =

- Other names: Aortic aneurysm syndrome due to TGF-beta receptors anomalies
- This condition is inherited in an autosomal dominant manner
- Pronunciation: /ˌloʊiːzˈdiːts/ LOH-eez-DEETS
- Specialty: Cardiology, rheumatology, medical genetics

Loeys–Dietz syndrome (LDS) is an autosomal dominant genetic connective tissue disorder. It has features similar to Marfan syndrome and Ehlers–Danlos syndrome. The disorder is marked by aneurysms in the aorta, often in children, and the aorta may also undergo sudden dissection in the weakened layers of the wall of the aorta. Aneurysms and dissections also can occur in arteries other than the aorta. Because aneurysms in children tend to rupture early, children are at greater risk for dying if the syndrome is not identified. Surgery to repair aortic aneurysms is essential for treatment. It was previously believed that the life expectancy of an individual with this condition was around 30-40 years of age; however, with progressive treatments such as possibilities for surgery and medications like losartan, it is now proven that life expectancy can be normal with appropriate medical intervention.

There are five types of the syndrome, designated types I through V, caused by mutations in TGFBR1, TGFBR2, SMAD3, TGFB2, and TGFB3, respectively. These five genes encoding transforming growth factors play a role in cell signaling that promotes growth and development of the body's tissues. Mutations of these genes cause production of proteins without function. The skin cells for individuals with Loeys–Dietz syndrome are not able to produce collagen, the protein that allows skin cells to be strong and elastic. This causes these individuals to be susceptible to different tears in the skin such as hernias. Although the disorder has an autosomal pattern of inheritance, this disorder results from a new gene mutation in 75% of cases and occurs in people with no history of the disorder in their family. In other cases, it is inherited from one affected parent.

Loeys–Dietz syndrome was identified and characterized by pediatric geneticists Bart Loeys and Harry Dietz at Johns Hopkins University in 2005.

== Signs and symptoms ==
There is considerable variability in the phenotype of Loeys–Dietz syndrome, from mild features to severe systemic abnormalities. The primary manifestations of Loeys–Dietz syndrome are arterial tortuosity (winding course of blood vessels), widely spaced eyes (hypertelorism), wide or split uvula, and aneurysms at the aortic root. Other features may include cleft palate and a blue/gray appearance of the white of the eyes. Cardiac defects and club foot may be noted at birth.

There is overlap in the manifestations of Loeys–Dietz and Marfan syndromes, including increased risk of ascending aortic aneurysm and aortic dissection, abnormally long limbs and fingers, and dural ectasia (a gradual stretching and weakening of the dura mater that can cause abdominal and leg pain). Findings of hypertelorism (widely spaced eyes), bifid or split uvula, and skin findings such as easy bruising or abnormal scars may distinguish Loeys–Dietz from Marfan syndrome.

Affected individuals often develop immune system related problems such as allergies to food, asthma, hay fever, and inflammatory disorders such as eczema or inflammatory bowel disease.

Findings of Loeys–Dietz syndrome may include:

- Skeletal malformations
  - Craniosynostosis
  - Scoliosis
  - Kyphosis
  - Spinal instability and spondylolisthesis
  - Sternal abnormalities (pectus excavatum/pectus carinatum)
  - Joint hypermobility
  - Camptodactyly
  - Long fingers
  - Club foot
- Facial abnormalities
  - Weakened or missing eye muscles (strabismus)
  - Widely spaced eyes (hypertelorism)
- Congenital heart defects
  - Patent ductus arteriosus
  - Atrial septal defect
  - Bicuspid aortic valve
  - Crossed pulmonary arteries
- Translucency of the skin with a velvety texture
- Arnold–Chiari malformation

== Cause ==
=== Types (old nomenclature) ===
Several genetic causes of Loeys–Dietz syndrome have been identified. A de novo mutation in TGFB3, a ligand of the TGF β pathway, was identified in an individual with a syndrome presenting partially overlapping symptoms of Marfan syndrome and Loeys–Dietz syndrome.

Type	Gene	Locus	OMIM	Description
1A	TGFBR1	9q22	609192	Also known as Furlong syndrome
1B	TGFBR2	3p22	610168	
2A	TGFBR1	9q22	608967	
2B	TGFBR2	3p22	610380	Previously known as Marfan syndrome type 2
3	SMAD3	15q22.33	613795	Also known as Aneurysms-osteoarthritis syndrome
4	TGFB2	1q41	614816	
5	TGFB3	14q24.3	615582	
6	SMAD2	18q21.1	619656	

== Diagnosis ==
Diagnosis involves consideration of physical features and genetic testing. Presence of split uvula is a differentiating characteristic from Marfan syndrome, as well as the severity of the heart defects. Loeys–Dietz syndrome patients have more severe heart involvement and it is advised that they be treated for enlarged aorta earlier due to the increased risk of early rupture in Loeys–Dietz patients. Because different people express different combinations of symptoms and the syndrome was first identified in 2005, many doctors may not be aware of its existence.

== Treatment ==
As there is no known cure, Loeys–Dietz syndrome is a lifelong condition. Due to the high risk of death from aortic aneurysm rupture, patients should be followed closely to monitor aneurysm formation, which can then be corrected with vascular surgery. Previous research in laboratory mice has suggested that the angiotensin II receptor antagonist losartan, which appears to block TGF-beta activity, can slow or halt the formation of aortic aneurysms in Marfan syndrome. A large clinical trial sponsored by the National Institutes of Health is currently underway to explore the use of losartan to prevent aneurysms in Marfan syndrome patients. Both Marfan syndrome and Loeys–Dietz syndrome are associated with increased TGF-beta signaling in the vessel wall. Therefore, losartan also holds promise for the treatment of Loeys–Dietz syndrome. In those patients in which losartan is not halting the growth of the aorta, irbesartan has been shown to work and is currently also being studied and prescribed for some patients with this condition.

If an increased heart rate is present, a cardioselective beta-1 blocker, with or without losartan, is sometimes prescribed to reduce the heart rate to prevent any extra pressure on the tissue of the aorta. Likewise, strenuous physical activity is discouraged in patients, especially weight lifting and contact sports.

== Epidemiology ==
The incidence of Loeys–Dietz syndrome is unknown; however, Type 1 and 2 appear to be the most common.
