= Dolichostenomelia =

Abnormally long limbs

Dolichostenomelia is a human condition in which the limbs are unusually long. The name is derived from Ancient Greek dolichos 'long' steno 'short, narrow, close' and melia 'of the limbs'. It is a common feature of several kinds of hereditary disorders which affect connective tissue, such as Marfan syndrome and homocystinuria.
