= Acromicric dysplasia =

- Other names: Acromicric skeletal dysplasia

Acromicric dysplasia is an extremely rare inherited disorder characterized by abnormally short hands and feet, growth retardation and delayed bone maturation leading to short stature. Most cases have occurred randomly for no apparent reason (sporadically). However, autosomal dominant inheritance has not been ruled out.

The disorder is different from, but similar to, other syndromic entities such as geleophysic dysplasia, Weill-Marchesani syndrome, and Myhre syndrome.

== Genetics ==
This condition has been associated with mutations in the Fibrillin 1 (FBN1) gene.

Mutations in this gene have also been associated with stiff skin syndrome, Marfan syndrome and its variant Marfanoid–progeroid–lipodystrophy syndrome, autosomal dominant Weill-Marchesani syndrome, isolated ectopia lentis, MASS phenotype, and Shprintzen-Goldberg syndrome.
