= Adolescent idiopathic scoliosis =

- Other names: Adolescent-onset idiopathic scoliosis
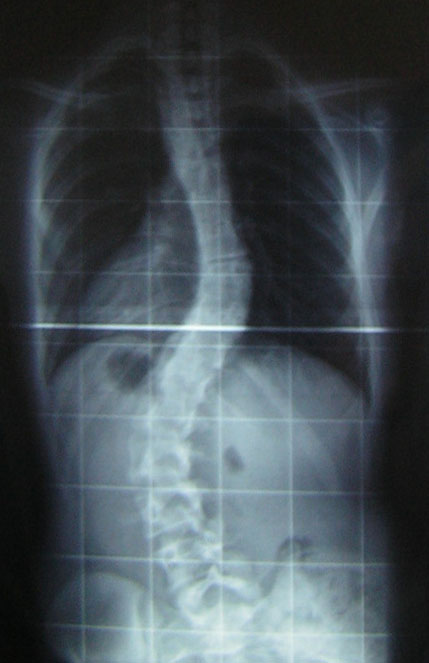
- Radiography of adolescent idiopathic scoliosis before corrective surgery.
- Specialty: Medical genetics
- Symptoms: Scoliosis that appears at the age of 10-18
- Complications: Most cases are usually mild, therefore they do not have any complications, however; in rare cases where the curvature is severe, breathing problems and problems with balance can arise.
- Usual onset: 10-18 years old
- Duration: Life-long (usually)
- Causes: "Idiopathic" means that the general cause of the disorder is usually unknown.
- Risk factors: Genetic and environmental factors
- Diagnostic method: Physical examination, Radiography
- Prevention: Reducing the frequency of being in an abnormal posture.
- Treatment: Physical therapy, correctional surgery
- Prognosis: Good
- Frequency: Rather common, affecting approximately 2 to 4% of adolescents (1 in 50/1 in 25-30 adolescents)

Adolescent idiopathic scoliosis (AIS) is a disorder in which the spine starts abnormally curving sideways (scoliosis) between the ages of 10 and 18 years old. Generally, AIS occurs during the growth spurt associated with adolescence. In some teens, the curvature is progressive, meaning that it gets worse over time, however, AIS more commonly manifests only as a mild curvature.

== Signs and symptoms ==
Since most cases of AIS are mild, teenagers with the condition typically do not show any obvious signs such as pain. Instead, most symptoms associated with AIS consist of physical features that would not typically be present in a teenager without the condition, including asymmetry of the waist, shoulders, and legs (the latter involving length), prominence of the shoulder blades, abnormal gait or walking, leaning towards and favouring one side of the body, tilting of the pelvis, and elevation of the hips. External signs include a visual or physical discomfort with clothes of certain fits.

== Complications ==
Most patients with AIS do not go on to develop health complications due to the fact that most cases of the condition are usually non-progressive and/or mild to moderate in severity. Those who do develop complications usually are part of the smaller group of AIS patients with severe cases, with the most common health complications among this group of patients being abnormalities that involve the lungs (such as bilateral reduction in lung volume). These abnormalities usually result in impairments of the respiratory function ranging from mild to severe.

Other complications associated with severe scoliosis include internal intrathoracic organ displacement and the disruption of appropriate rib movement. Back pain is the most common of complications that may be experienced by patients with both non-severe and severe cases alike. Patients with extremely severe cases of AIS (individuals with a Cobb angle of 100° or higher) typically have a shortened life expectancy, generally dying prematurely.

== Causes ==
Although the cause of Adolescent Idiopathic Scoliosis is generally unknown, it is believed to be caused by both genetic and environmental factors.

=== Genetics ===
Although has been noted that approximately 30% of teenagers diagnosed with AIS also have a family history of AIS, there is still no known genetic cause or mutation which may be identified as being fully or partially responsible for the condition. Various genetic variants have been described in medical literature and noted as having the potential to increase a person's susceptibility in developing adolescent idiopathic scoliosis. Some of those genes include:

==== CHD7 ====
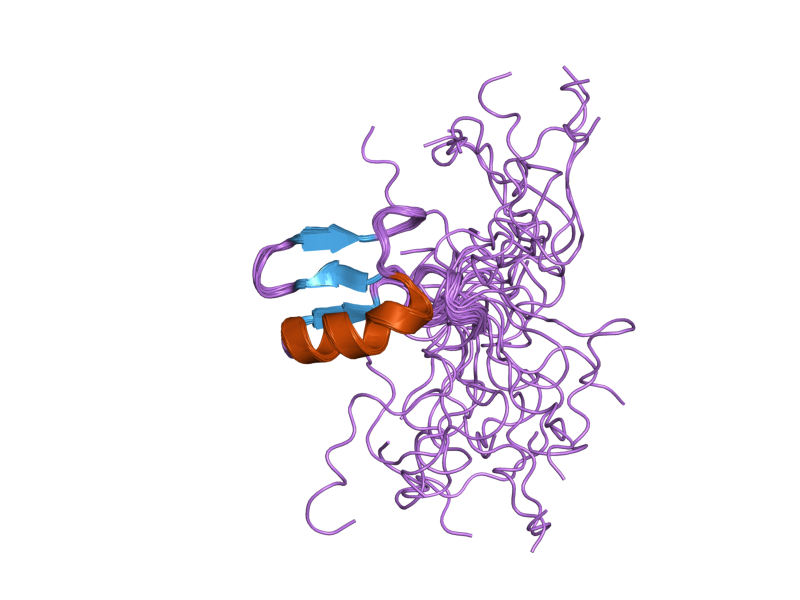
Chromodomain-helicase-DNA-binding protein 7, the enzyme coded by the CHD7 gene

In a study done in 2006, genomewide linkage scans were performed on 130 patients from 53 families where adolescent idiopathic scoliosis had been segregated as a familial trait, these scans narrowed the AIS loci in these families to the 8q12 locus (in chromosome 8). Further genetic testing found 23 different polymorphisms in the CHD7 gene of these same patients, all of which were located inside a 116-kb genomic region which consisted of exons 2-4 of the same gene. The authors of the study noted that mutations in this gene are usually involved in the CHARGE syndrome, which has late-onset scoliosis as one of its common associated features. The SNPS were as follows:

- rs4738813, with the C allele representing a higher risk of AIS
- rs12544305, with the G allele representing a higher risk of AIS
- rs9643371, with the T allele representing a higher risk of AIS
- rs1017861, with the G allele representing a higher risk of AIS
- rs13256023, with the T allele representing a higher risk of AIS
- rs4288413, with the A allele representing a higher risk of AIS
- rs7000766, with the G allele representing a higher risk of AIS
- hcv148921, with the A allele representing a higher risk of AIS
- rs1483207, with the G allele representing a higher risk of AIS
- rs1483208, with the A allele representing a higher risk of AIS
- rs1038351, with the T allele representing a higher risk of AIS
- rs7843033, with the C allele representing a higher risk of AIS
- rs7002806, with the T allele representing a higher risk of AIS
- rs7842389, with the T allele representing a higher risk of AIS
- rs7017676, with the A allele representing s higher risk of AIS
- hcv509505, with the G allele representing a higher risk of AIS
- rs4392940, with the A allele representing a higher risk of AIS
- rs4237036, with the T allele representing a higher risk of AIS
- rs13280978, with the T allele representing a higher risk of AIS
- rs4301480, with the A allele representing a higher risk of AIS
- rs10957159, with the G allele representing a higher risk of AIS
- rs10092214, with the A allele representing a higher risk of AIS
- rs3763591, with the T allele representing a higher risk of AIS

The authors believed that the decrease of functional CHD7 protein during the growth spurt that occurs during adolescence predisposed the individuals to their spinal curvature by disrupting normal growth patterns and turning them abnormal.

==== PAX1 ====
In a study done in 2015, evidence was found for a sex-linked genetic cause of AIS; by performing a genomewide association study on more than 3,000 "idiopathic scoliosis" patients, the authors found that SNPs in the 20p11.2 locus (specifically those located in the PAX1 gene) were associated with a higher chance of developing adolescent scoliosis, moreover, these genetic variants were shown to increase the risk of AIS significantly for women, while barely doing the same for men. They also found that the same genetic variants that increased the risk of AIS also reduced the risk of early-onset hair loss in the participants involved in the study.

==== LBX1 ====
A Japanese study in 2011 found an SNP associated with an increased risk of developing adolescent idiopathic scoliosis. A Chinese study undertaken in 2012 also further supported this finding.

The SNP investigated in both studies is called rs11190870. This SNP was located in an area 75 kb 3' of the LBX1 gene, an intergenic area that also happened to be close to a separate gene called FLJ41350.

The authors of a separate Japanese study, undertaken in 2015, created animal models relating to the gene, said animal models consisted of zebrafishes which were made to have overexpression of the three Lbx1 genes, this overexpression was found to cause early-onset scoliosis in the zebrafish used for the study.

A 2021 Chinese study found another SNP (rs1322330) in the gene associated with the condition. Participants included 1,980 AIS patients and 2,499 healthy control subjects, all patients and control subjects were of Han Chinese ancestry. "A" was the risk allele for the condition.

==== GPR126 ====
In a different Japanese study done in 2013, researchers found an SNP (rs6570507) which was associated with an increased risk of AIS, said SNP was found in the GPR126 gene, located in chromosome 6. This same SNP is associated with increased length of the trunk in people of primarily European ancestry.

A Chinese study done in 2015 found evidence for an association between three SNPS in intronic regions of the gene and AIS. They were as follows:

- rs6570507 (A>G), with G being the risk allele for AIS
- rs7774095 (A>C), with C being the risk allele for AIS
- rs7755109 (A>G), with G being the risk allele for AIS

==== BNC2 ====
An SNP known as rs10738445 increases the risk of AIS, this gene is located in the aforementioned gene, and the risk allele for adolescent idiopathic scoliosis is A, while the normal allele is C. This SNP, however, has only been studied in AIS patients of Han Chinese ancestry.

==== SLC39A8 ====
In a study done in 2018, a group of researchers performed an exome-wide association study on more than 1,000 European-American patients with severe adolescent idiopathic scoliosis and found an SNP (rs13107325) which was seen to be strongly associated with the condition in the patients. Other features that were seen to be associated with the 391T scoliosis risk allele included short stature, lower-than-average plasma Mn2+ levels, and a high body mass index. The researchers leading the study decided to do an animal model to simulate the effects of the mutation by engineering zebrafish with homozygous tandem duplications in their SLC39A8 genes, most zebrafish within the animal model developed vertebral and "thoracical deformities" and were short of body length.

==== NTF3 ====
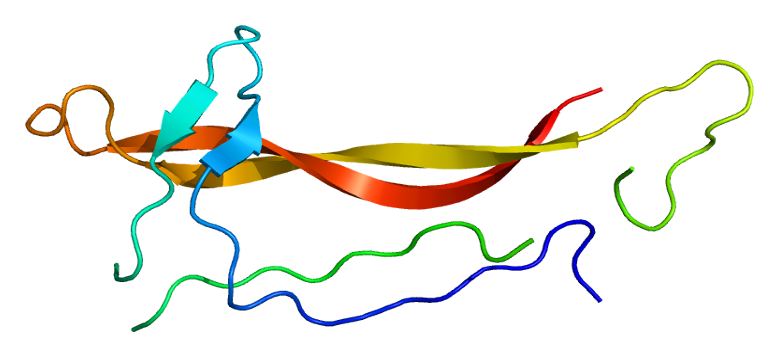
Neurotrophin 3, a protein that is encoded by the NTF3 gene

In a Chinese study done in 2012, 500 patients with AIS were recruited for a genomewide association study. This study found an SNP (rs11063714) in the NTF3 gene which, while not necessarily involved in the patients' AIS itself, was involved in the severity of the scoliosis itself. Patients who were homozygous for the A allele (AA genotype) tended to have milder scoliosis than patients who were homozygous for the G allele at the same position (GG genotype), the latter group of patients were more likely to suffer from severe scoliosis, whereas patients with the AA genotype were more likely to have successful results from brace treatment than their GG counterparts.

==== FBN1 ====
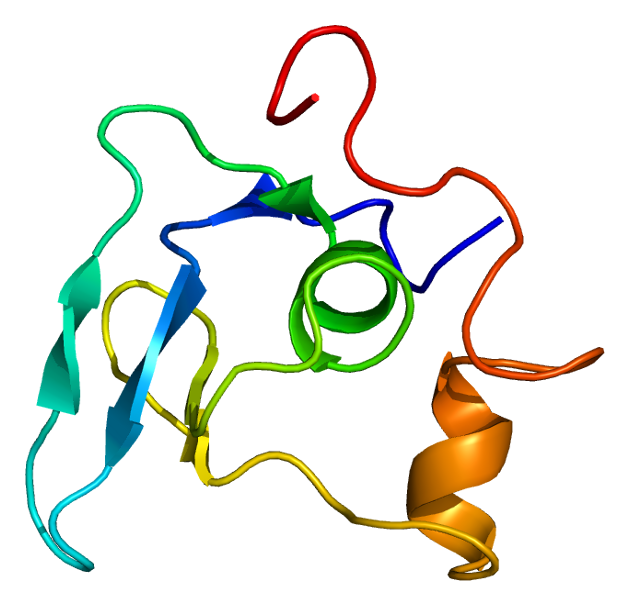
Fibrillin 1, protein encoded by the FBN1 gene

In a study done in 2014, researchers undertook whole-exome sequencing on 91 Caucasian patients with severe adolescent idiopathic scoliosis and 331 Caucasian control subjects in order to find rare genetic mutations that might be deleterious and involved in AIS. The list of mutations that were considered rare by the researchers consisted of coding variants that were absent on the dbSNP database and caused insertions, deletions, frameshift, splice-site, or missense mutations.

Rare mutations in the FBN1 and FBN2 genes were found in AIS patients and control subjects alike, the following list consists specifically of the mutations found in the FBN1 gene:

- T>A missense mutation (p. Ile107Leu) at chr15:48 902 952
- T>G missense mutation (p.Asn280Thr) at chr15:48 826 300
- T>C missense mutation (p.Gln697Arg) at chr15:48 796 007
- T>G missense mutation (p.Asn703His) at chr15:48 795 990
- C>T missense mutation (p. Val916Met) at chr15:48 784 766
- C>T missense mutation (p.Gly1217Ser) at chr15:48 777 634
- G>A missense mutation (p.Pro1225Leu) at chr15:48 777 609
- C>T missense mutation (p.Gly1313Ser) at chr15:48 773 879
- A>C missense mutation (p. Leu1405Arg) at chr15:48 764 870
- A>G missense mutation (p.Met1576Thr) at chr15:48 760 155
- C>T missense mutation (p.Arg1850His) at chr15:48 741 087
- C>T missense mutation (p.Gly2003Arg) at chr15:48 736 768
- A>T missense mutation (p.Asn2178Lys) at chr15:48 726 873
- T>A missense mutation (p.Tyr2225Phe) at chr15:48 725 128
- A>G missense mutation (p. Ile2585Thr) at chr15:48 712 949
- C>T missense mutation (p. Val2868Ile) at chr15:48 703 201

Of the 16 FBN1 mutations listed, three had previously been described as associated with Marfan syndrome, a rare autosomal dominant genetic disorder characterized by Marfanoid habitus, joint hypermobility, and cardiac problems.

==== FBN2 ====
The same 2014 study mentioned above also detected mutations in the FBN2 of some of the people they used for the study:

- C>T missense mutation (p.Gly53Asp) at chr5:127 873 139
- C>T missense mutation (p.Arg92Lys) at chr5:127 872 157
- A>ACTGTA frameshift mutation at chr5:127 782 238
- C>T missense mutation (p. Val592Met) at chr5:127 713 520
- G>T missense mutation (p.Pro740His) at chr5:127 704 904
- G>A missense mutation (p.Arg1021Cys) at chr5:127 681 205
- A>C missense mutation (p. Ile1116Ser) at chr5:127 674 750
- G>C missense mutation (p. Leu1125Val) at chr5:127 674 724
- C>T missense mutation (p.Glu1178Lys) at chr5:127 673 755
- C>G missense mutation (p.Gly1271Ala) at chr5:127 671 182
- G>T missense mutation (p.Pro2085Thr) at chr5:127 627 260
- T>C missense mutation (p. Ile2466Val) at chr5:127 613 647
- A>G missense mutation (p.Phe2603Ser) at chr5:127 609 564
- C>T missense mutation (p.Gly2620Glu) at chr5:127 607 792

==== AKAP2 ====
In a 2016 study done on a single Chinese family with familial adolescent idiopathic scoliosis, researchers found a c.2645A>C missense mutation in the AKAP2 gene of affected members by performing whole exome sequencing. This genetic variant was not found in the 1,254 AIS patients and 1,232 control subjects of Chinese ancestry during a later Chinese study.

==== Copy number variants ====
In a different study from 2014, researchers undertook genomewide copy number variant screening on 143 patients with AIS and 1,079 control subjects (consisting of 666 healthy control subjects from a previous bipolar disorder study and 413 patients from a previous congenital clubfoot study). The following list consists of the CNVs found in the participants of the study:

- 1q21.1 duplication, found in 3 out of the 143 patients with AIS (2.1%) and in 1 out of the 1,079 control subjects (0.09%).
  - Family history examination in the patients with the duplication did not find any reports of intellectual disability or developmental delay, two usual findings in patients with the 1q21.1 duplication syndrome.
- X chromosome duplication, found in 2 out of the 143 patients (1.4%) and in 1 out of the 529 female control subjects (0.19%).
  - Said patients were female, and thus had a 47,XXX karyotype (instead of the usual 46,XX female karyotype), the only clinical finding that the 2 patients with trisomy X shared was tall stature, with no signs of intellectual disability or developmental delay whatsoever.
- 2q13 duplication, found in 1 out of the 143 AIS patients and in 7 out of the 1,079 control subjects
- 15q11.2 deletion, found in 1 out of the 143 AIS patients and in 4 out of the 1,079 control subjects
- 15q11.2 duplication, found in 1 out of the 143 AIS patients and in 5 out of the 1,079 control subjects
- 16p11.2 duplication, found in 1 out of the 143 AIS patients and in 2 out of the 1,079 control subjects
  - The only AIS patient with this chromosomal duplication also had spina bifida occulta.

== Diagnosis ==
This condition can be diagnosed through the use of the following diagnostic methods:

- Physical examination
  - Asymmetric shoulders
  - Asymmetric leg length
  - Cavovarus
  - Prominent ribs
  - Physical tests such as Adams test
- MRIs
- Radiographs

For adolescent idiopathic scoliosis to be considered as a diagnostic option in the patient, said patient must be between the ages of 10 and 18 years old.

== Treatment ==
Treatment for mild cases of AIS (less than 20° Cobb angle) usually consists of regular physical check-ups done in a clinical environment to monitor the curvature of the individual's spine. The purpose of these check-ups is preventative, with them being undertaken in order for medical professionals to be able to detect and treat any potential progression of the condition as early as possible. Alongside regular check-ups, individuals with mild AIS are often encouraged to use other methods such as the Schroth method, which focuses on posture, breathing and strength training, as well as more general stretching exercises. in order to manage the effects of the condition but the evidence for exercise efficacy is limited.

Treatment for moderate cases of AIS (between 20 and 40° Cobb angle) usually consists of bracing of the spine; typically this will not change the curvature in and on itself, but prevents the spine's curvature from progressing any further and developing into a more serious case of AIS. Whilst there are several different types of brace, the best quality evidence supports the use of full-time braces. However, braces worn only at night-time are being increasingly being used (which work slightly differently to full-time braces by 'over correcting' the spine at night time), which overcome some of the challenges of brace wear (i.e. enabling sports participation). There a currently high-quality randomised controlled study going on throughout the UK, funded by the National Institute for Health Research, which is comparing night-time braces to full-time braces; called the BASIS study.

Treatment for severe cases of AIS (more than 40° Cobb angle) consists of corrective surgery usually involving bone grafts and the insertion of proper spinal instrumentation into the spine. These treatments typically do not have high post-surgical complication rates. Escalation to surgery is generally indicated if the thoracic spine has a Cobb angle of >50° or the lumbar spine has an angle of >40°. Surgery is also considered in skeletally mature patients who have curve progression.

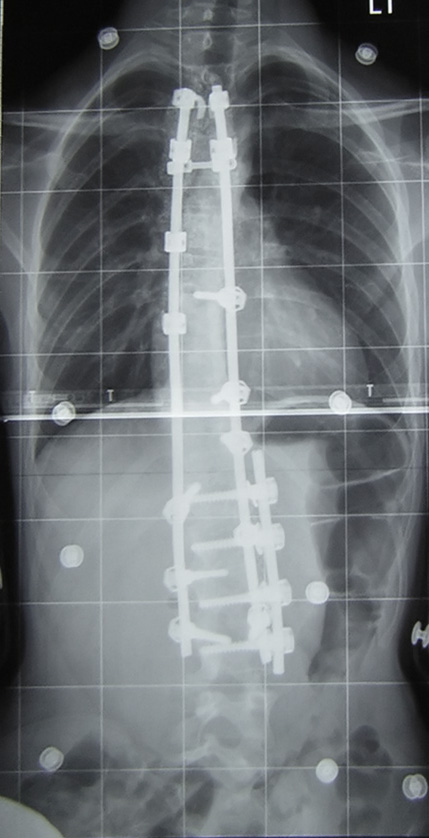
Scoliosis bracing treatment

== Epidemiology ==
AIS is the most common form of idiopathic scoliosis, accounting for around 90% of all cases. Adolescent Idiopathic Scoliosis affects between 1 and 4% of teenagers, with treatment being required for only 0.25% of teenagers with the condition. An even smaller portion of individuals may die due to the severe curvature as well as the related symptoms and effects. AIS appears to be more common among those living in northern latitudes.

Although mild curvature affects females and males equally, severe curvatures tend to affect female teens more than male teens. Post-surgical complications are most common among men and those with coexisting health conditions (such as anemia).

== See also ==
- Scoliosis
- Kyphosis
- Kyphoscoliosis
