= Stiff skin syndrome =

- Specialty: Medical genetics

Stiff skin syndrome (also known as "Congenital fascial dystrophy") is a cutaneous condition characterized by ‘rock hard’ induration, thickening of the skin and subcutaneous tissues, limited joint mobility, and mild hypertrichosis in infancy or early childhood. Immunologic abnormalities or vascular hyperactivity are not present in patients.

Not much is known about it, cause or treatment, and further investigation is required, as it has only been reported 41 times throughout history.

== Genetics ==
This condition is associated with mutations in the Fibrillin 1 (FBN1) gene.

== Diagnosis ==
=== Differential diagnosis ===
Other conditions associated with mutations in this gene include acromicric dysplasia, Marfan syndrome and its variant Marfanoid–progeroid–lipodystrophy syndrome, autosomal dominant Weill-Marchesani syndrome, isolated ectopia lentis, MASS phenotype, and Shprintzen-Goldberg syndrome.

== See also ==
- Scleroderma
- Self-healing papular mucinosis
- List of cutaneous conditions
