= MFAP =

MFAP may stand for:

- MFAP1, Microfibrillar-associated protein 1
- MFAP2, Microfibrillar-associated protein 2
- MFAP3, Microfibrillar-associated protein 3
- MFAP4, Microfibrillar-associated protein 4
- MFAP5, Microfibrillar-associated protein 5
