= MFAP5 =

Protein-coding gene in the species Homo sapiens

Identifiers
- Aliases: MFAP5, MAGP-2, MAGP2, MFAP-5, MP25, AAT9, microfibrillar associated protein 5, microfibril associated protein 5
- External IDs: OMIM: 601103; MGI: 1354387; GeneCards: MFAP5

Gene location (Human)
Chr.	Chromosome 12 (human)
Band	12p13.31	Start	8,637,346 bp
Band	12p13.31	End	8,662,888 bp

Gene location (Mouse)
Chr.	Chromosome 6 (mouse)
Band	6|6 F1	Start	122,482,804 bp
Band	6|6 F1	End	122,506,249 bp
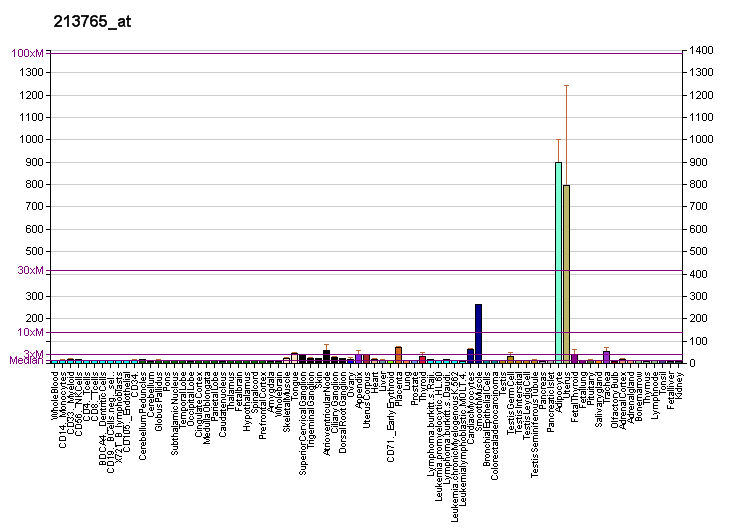

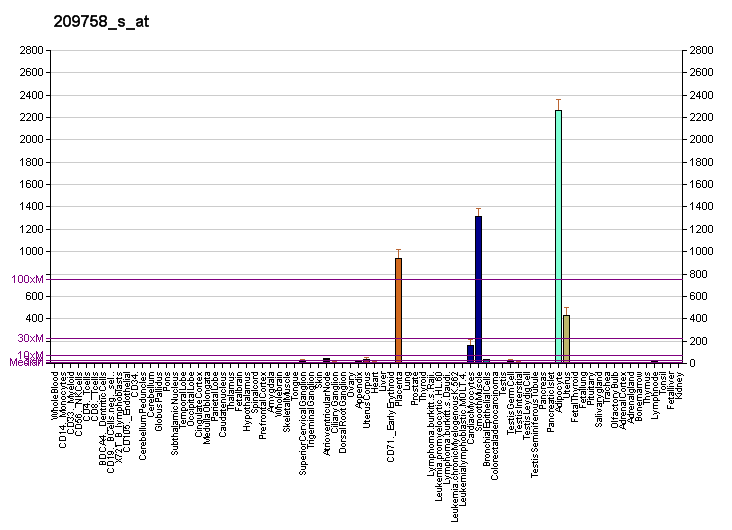

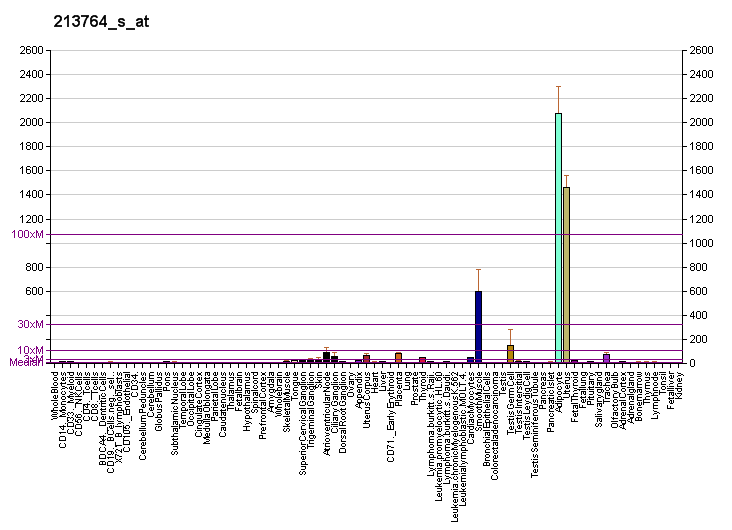
RNA expression pattern
Bgee	Human / Mouse (ortholog); Top expressed in: synovial joint; skin of hip; tibial nerve; smooth muscle tissue; pericardium; placenta; right coronary artery; vena cava; urethra; decidua / Top expressed in: decidua; gastrula; ascending aorta; sciatic nerve; aortic valve; cervix; ankle; esophagus; intercostal muscle; extraocular muscle; More reference expression data
BioGPS	More reference expression data
Gene ontology
Molecular function	extracellular matrix structural constituent
Cellular component	extracellular region; microfibril; extracellular matrix; collagen-containing extracellular matrix
Biological process	definitive hemopoiesis; extracellular matrix organization; supramolecular fiber organization
Sources:Amigo / QuickGO
Orthologs
Databases	NCBI: entry; OMA: entry
Species	Human	Mouse
Entrez	8076	50530
Ensembl	ENSG00000197614	ENSMUSG00000030116
UniProt	Q13361	Q9QZJ6
RefSeq (mRNA)	NM_001297709; NM_001297710; NM_001297711; NM_001297712; NM_003480	NM_015776; NM_001347434
RefSeq (protein)	NP_001284638; NP_001284639; NP_001284640; NP_001284641; NP_003471	NP_001334363; NP_056591
Location (UCSC)	Chr 12: 8.64 – 8.66 Mb	Chr 6: 122.48 – 122.51 Mb
PubMed search
- Wikidata
View/Edit Human	View/Edit Mouse

Microfibrillar-associated protein 5 is a protein that in humans is encoded by the MFAP5 gene.

This gene encodes a 25-kD microfibril-associated glycoprotein which is rich in serine and threonine residues. It lacks a hydrophobic carboxyl terminus and proline-, glutamine-, and tyrosine-rich regions, which are characteristics of a related 31-kDa microfibril-associated glycoprotein (MFAP2). The close similarity between these two proteins is confined to a central region of 60 aa where precise alignment of 7 cysteine residues occurs. The structural differences suggest that this encoded protein has some functions that are distinct from those of MFAP2.
