= Envoplakin-like =

Protein-coding gene

EVPLL

Identifiers
- Aliases: EVPLL, envoplakin like
- External IDs: GeneCards: EVPLL
Available structures
PDB	Human UniProt search: PDBe RCSB
PDB	List of PDB id codes 4QMD

Gene location (Human)
Chr.	Chromosome 17 (human)
Band	17p11.2	Start	18,377,778 bp
Band	17p11.2	End	18,389,647 bp
RNA expression pattern
Bgee	Human / Mouse (ortholog); Top expressed in: gonad; testicle; skin of abdomen; vagina; skin of leg; right testis; right lobe of liver; left testis; upper lobe of left lung; right lung / n/a; More reference expression data
BioGPS	n/a
Gene ontology
Molecular function	intermediate filament binding; structural molecule activity; protein-macromolecule adaptor activity
Cellular component	cornified envelope; cytoplasm; intermediate filament; membrane
Biological process	epidermis development; wound healing; intermediate filament cytoskeleton organization
Sources:Amigo / QuickGO
Orthologs
Databases	NCBI: entry; OMA: entry
Species	Human	Mouse
Entrez	645027	n/a
Ensembl	ENSG00000284166; ENSG00000214860	n/a
UniProt	A8MZ36	n/a
RefSeq (mRNA)	NM_001145127	n/a
RefSeq (protein)	NP_001138599	n/a
Location (UCSC)	Chr 17: 18.38 – 18.39 Mb	n/a
PubMed search		n/a
- Wikidata
View/Edit Human

Envoplakin-like, also known as EVPLL, is a protein which in humans is encoded by the EVPLL gene. The EVPLL gene plays a role in structural molecule activity, intermediate filament (IF) organization, and wound healing. The orthologs of EVPLL are conserved across a variety of vertebrates such as birds, mammals, and bony fishes.

== Gene ==
Envoplakin-Like (EVPLL) is a protein-coding gene located on chromosome 17 (17p11.2) in humans. The gene has 1979 base pairs and spans approximately 11.89 kilobases on the direct strand. EVPLL consists of 11 exons that produce two alternatively spliced mRNAs. EVPLL is located in the gene neighborhood of MFAP4 (upstream) and SHMT1 (downstream).

== Transcript ==
The EVPLL gene is predominantly expressed in tissues like the skin and esophagus, where it is localized in the cytoplasm, membrane, and cornified envelope.

The human EVPLL has 7 isoforms with varying protein lengths.

Isoforms of Homo sapiens (human) EVPLL Gene
Isoform Number (#)	mRNA Accession Number from NCBI (#)	mRNA Length (bp)	Protein Accession Number (#)	Protein Length (aa)	Molecular Weight (kDA)
1	XM_047436537.1	2547	XP_047292493.1	301	33.8
2	XM_011523982.3	1970	XP_011522284.1	298	33.6
3	XM_011523983.3	1154	XP_011522285.1	292	32.9
4	XM_011523985.3	1883	XP_011522287.1	269	29.9
5	XM_011523986.3	885	XP_011522289.1	225	23.2
6	XM_047436538.1	1936	XP_047292494.1	207	22.8
7	XM_011523987.3	845	XP_011522289.1	171	18.7

== Protein ==
The molecular weight of the EVPLL protein without molecular modifications is 34.0kDa and the isoelectric point is 5.80. There is a notably high content of glutamine, making up 11% of the protein.

=== Function ===
The EVPLL protein expression is associated with structural molecule activity such as intermediate filament (IF) organization and wound healing. It is predicted to enable structural integrity within epithelial tissues, particularly in the cytoplasm and membrane.

=== Domains, motifs, and secondary structure ===
There are 2 spectrin-repeat domains from amino acids 1-93 and 190-286. There are 2 coiled-coil regions which includes amino acids 1-63 and 66-95.

=== Protein interactions ===
EVPLL has interactions with Capicua transcriptional repressor (CIC), a transcriptional regulator located in the nucleus. EVPLL also has interactions with Parkin RBR E3 ubiquitin protein ligase (PARK2), a ubiquitin tagging protein located in the cytoplasm. EVPLL has interactions with Schalfen-like protein (SLFNL1) and Carbonic anhydrase-related protein 11 (CA11). EVPLL has been experimentally determined to have interactions with neuroblastoma breakpoint family member 4 (NBPF4).

== Gene-level regulation ==
EVPLL is expressed in a variety of tissues, but most notably high in the esophagus, skin, and testis. There is a relatively high amount of expression in the lungs, stomach, and kidney. RNA sequencing of 20 human transcriptomes show that the RNA is expressed highly in the lungs, prostate, kidney, and thymus of adults. The RNA is expressed highly in the lungs at 20 weeks and stomach at 18-20 weeks gestational age. The EVPLL protein abundance in all human tissues are at a level below 1ppm, indicating a lower-than-average expression level compared to other human proteins.

== Protein-Level Regulation ==
With subcellular localization, EVPLL is likely to reside within the nucleus and cytoplasm. EVPLL lacks transmembrane segments and signal peptides.

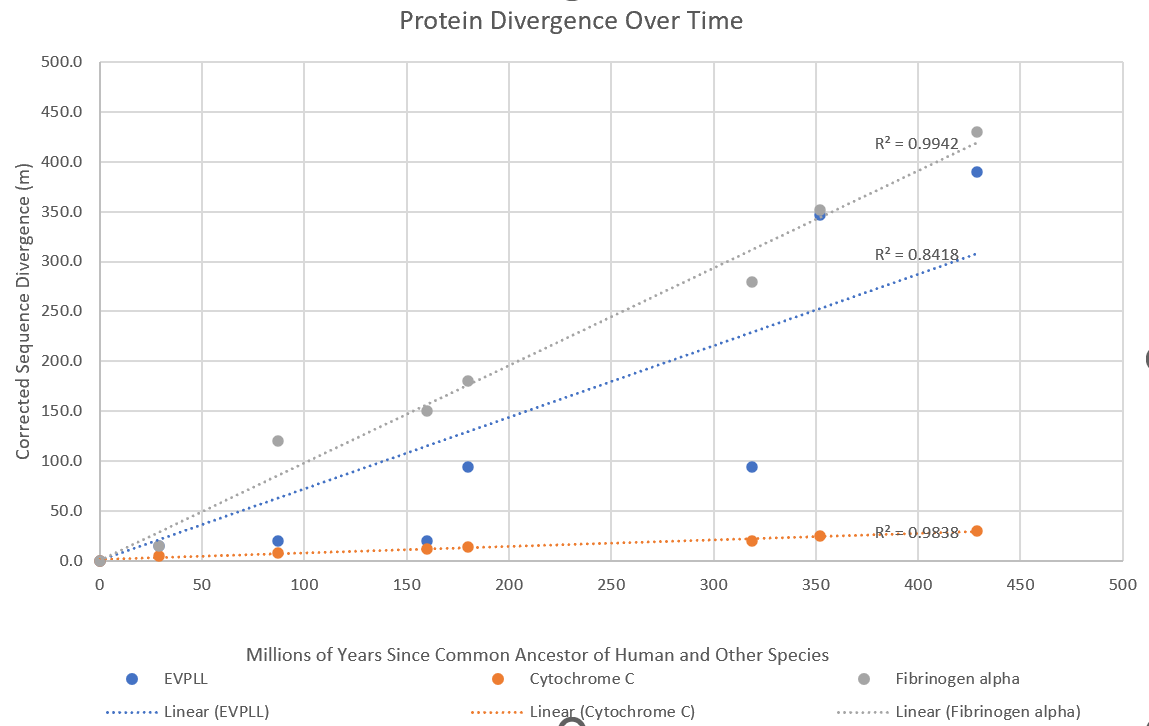
Time-calibrated graph displaying dates of divergence for the human EVPLL gene, Cytochrome C, and Fibrinogen alpha Chain.

== Homology and evolution ==
=== Orthologs ===
EVPLL has homologs across various vertebrate species, including mammals, birds, and fishes. The EVPLL lacks orthologs within invertebrates.

EVPLL	Genus and Species	Common Name	Taxonomic Group	Median Date of Divergence (MYA)	Accession #	Sequence Length (aa)	Sequence Identity to Human Protein (%)	Sequence Similarity to Human Protein (%)
Mammalia	Homo sapiens	Human	Primates	0	NP_001138599.1	301	100	100
	Pan troglodytes	Chimpanzee	Primates	6.4	XP_054526963.1	307	91	92.9
	Gorilla gorilla gorilla	Western lowland gorilla	Primates	8.6	XP_063562703.1	302	95	97
	Pongo pygmaeus	Bornean orangutan	Primates	15.2	XP_054314372.1	293	92	93.7
	Hylobates moloch	Silvery gibbon	Primates	19.5	XP_058284091.1	292	57.9	64
	Leptonychotes weddellii	Weddell seal	Carnivora	94	XP_006752112.2	293	79.7	85.7
	Equus przewalskii	Przewalskis horse	Perissodactyla	94	XP_008540515.1	293	62	70.6
	Physeter macrocephalus	Sperm whale	Cetacea	94	XP_054939461.1	282	57.8	67.6
Aves	Malurus melanocephalus	Red-backed fairywren	Passeriformes	319	XP_057234942.1	292	50.2	64.2
	Cygnus olor	Mute swan	Anseriformes	319	XP_040386607.1	292	49.2	62
	Neopsephotus bourkii	Bourke's parrot	Psittaciformes	319	XP_061210355.1	292	48.9	60.7
	Merops nubicus	Carmine bee-eater	Coraciiformes	319	XP_008948521.1	225	40.1	50.5
Reptiles	Sphaerodactylus townsendi	Townsend's least gecko	Squamata	319	XP_048345833.1	292	48.1	62.5
	Varanus komodoensis	Komodo Dragon	Squamata	319	XP_044309908.1	292	46.9	59.9
	Ophiophagus hannah	King Cobra	Squamata	319	ETE73234.1	259	38.7	54
	Anolis carolinensis	Green Anole	Squamata	319	XP_008115008.1	295	28	43.1
Amphibians	Ambystoma mexicanum	Axolotl	Urodela	352	XP_069510819.1	292	45.7	61.3
	Xenopus laevis	African clawed frog	Anura	352	XP_041433928.1	289	42.8	57.2
	Bombina bombina	Fire-bellied toad	Anura	352	XP_053565186.1	291	40.7	56.5
	Rhinatrema bivittatum	Two-lined caecilian	Gymnophiona	352	XP_029432184.1	289	28.4	45.6
Fishes	Chanodichthys erythropterus	Predatory carp	Cypriniformes	429	XP_067228760.1	294	37	54.3
	Paralichthys olivaceus	Japanese flounder	Pleuronectiformes	429	XP_069381809.1	295	34.8	50.6
	Cyprinus carpio	Common carp	Cypriniformes	429	XP_042571485.1	290	34.1	49.8
	Danio rerio	Zebrafish	Cypriniformes	429	XP_003201660.3	287	25.5	39.5

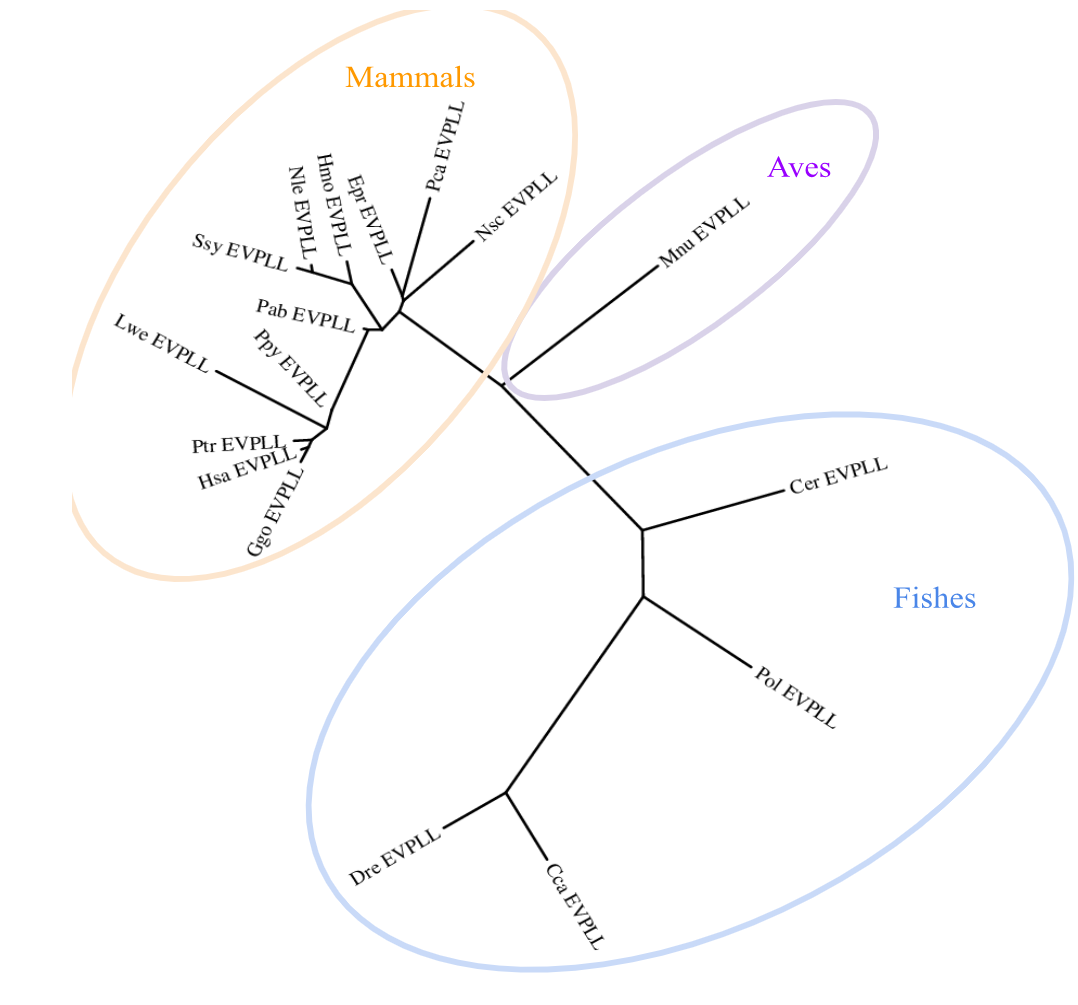
Phylogenetic Tree displaying orthologs of the human EVPLL gene.

== Clinical significance ==
=== Head and neck squamous cell carcinoma ===
EVPLL is one of the genes highlighted to be over-expressed in patients with better survival outcomes in Head and Neck Squamous Cell Carcinoma (HNSCC).

=== Alzheimer's disease ===
Current research suggests that EVPLL may contribute to neurodegeneration through its proximity to AD-associated piRNA DQ586113.
