= MFAP4 =

Protein found in humans

Identifiers
- Aliases: MFAP4, Mfap4, 1110007F23Rik, microfibrillar associated protein 4, microfibril associated protein 4
- External IDs: OMIM: 600596; MGI: 1342276; GeneCards: MFAP4

Gene location (Human)
Chr.	Chromosome 17 (human)
Band	17p11.2	Start	19,383,442 bp
Band	17p11.2	End	19,387,190 bp

Gene location (Mouse)
Chr.	Chromosome 11 (mouse)
Band	11 B2|11 37.96 cM	Start	61,376,257 bp
Band	11 B2|11 37.96 cM	End	61,379,726 bp
RNA expression pattern
Bgee	Human / Mouse (ortholog); Top expressed in: right coronary artery; Descending thoracic aorta; gallbladder; ascending aorta; right lung; left coronary artery; popliteal artery; tibial arteries; decidua; upper lobe of left lung / Top expressed in: left lung lobe; ascending aorta; external carotid artery; aortic valve; genital tubercle; internal carotid artery; right lung; right lung lobe; lip; efferent ductule; More reference expression data
BioGPS	n/a
Gene ontology
Molecular function	protein binding; extracellular matrix structural constituent
Cellular component	microfibril; extracellular matrix; extracellular region; elastic fiber; extracellular exosome; extracellular space; collagen-containing extracellular matrix
Biological process	UV protection; elastic fiber assembly; cell adhesion; cellular response to UV-B; regulation of collagen metabolic process; supramolecular fiber organization
Sources:Amigo / QuickGO
Orthologs
Databases	NCBI: entry; OMA: entry
Species	Human	Mouse
Entrez	4239	76293
Ensembl	ENSG00000166482	ENSMUSG00000042436
UniProt	P55083	Q9D1H9
RefSeq (mRNA)	NM_001198695; NM_002404	NM_029568; NM_001347545; NM_001361359
RefSeq (protein)	NP_001185624; NP_002395	NP_001334474; NP_083844; NP_001348288
Location (UCSC)	Chr 17: 19.38 – 19.39 Mb	Chr 11: 61.38 – 61.38 Mb
PubMed search
- Wikidata
View/Edit Human	View/Edit Mouse

MFAP4 (microfibril-associated glycoprotein 4) is an extracellular matrix protein encoded by the MFAP4 gene. It is part of the MFAP family of proteoglycans, which are involved in cell adhesion, intercellular interactions and the assembly and/or maintenance of elastic fibres.

MFAP4 is known to co-localise at sites rich in elastic fibres and is thought to interact with several proteins including FBN1, FBN2, tropoelastin and desmosine. It has a relatively non-specific tissue expression pattern, with higher levels observed in organs such as the lungs and vasculature.

== Clinical relevance ==
Using MFAP4-deficient mouse models, studies have shown roles for MFAP4 in neointima formation and asthma.

Moreover, it has recently been shown that the glycosylation of MFAP4 is raised in the aortic extracellular matrix of Marfan syndrome patients using proteomics and gene expression levels of MFAP4 correlate with alterations in extracellular matrix genes within human aortic vascular smooth muscle cells.

== Potential biomarker ==
MFAP4 has received considerable attention as a possible biomarker for many conditions including Marfan syndrome, surgical repair of abdominal aortic aneurysms, cardiovascular disease, COPD, liver fibrosis, and various cancers.
