= Merlin G. Butler =

American academic

Merlin G. Butler is an American physician scientist and professor at the University of Kansas Medical Center's Departments of Psychiatry & Behavioral Sciences and Pediatrics. He is American Board of Medical Genetics (ABMG) board-certified in Clinical Genetics and Clinical Cytogenetics and inducted into the American College of Medical Genetics and Genomics in 1993 as a founding fellow. He has over 550 publications in peer-reviewed journals, numerous book chapters and several authored and edited textbooks on genetics, developmental disabilities, autism, genetics of syndromic and non-syndromic conditions, career milestones, pediatric diseases and management of rare genetic disorders, specifically Prader-Willi syndrome.

== Early life and research ==
Merlin G. Butler was born in the sandhills of Nebraska in 1952. After graduating from high school from Stuart, Nebraska, he attended Chadron State College in Nebraska, where he studied biology and earned a Bachelor of Arts in education in 1974 and a Bachelor of Science with a Biology- Pre-Medicine major in 1975. Butler earned his M.D. in 1978 from the University of Nebraska Medical Center and a Ph.D. in Medical Genetics in 1984 from Indiana University. Between 1980 and 1984, he completed an American Board of Medical Genetics-accredited fellowship in Medical Genetics in Indiana and was named a Diplomate of the American Board of Medical Genetics in 1984. He has held several career roles in academic medicine at major academic medical centers as a physician and scientist in diagnosing and managing patients with rare genetic disorders and counseling patients and family members, supervising cytogenetic testing laboratories for diagnosis and care and conducting genetic-based research on rare genetic disorders including Prader-Willi, Angelman, fragile X, Burnside-Butler and Ehlers-Danlos syndromes along with rare chromosomal microdeletion disorders and personalized medicine (pharmacogenetics).

== Career ==
Butler has undertaken the diagnosis, counseling, care and treatment of thousands of patients presenting for genetic services in the clinical setting as well as directing genetics testing laboratories and clinical trials for rare genetic disorders. He has held funded external research including from the National Institute of Health on genetic and cytogenetic disorders for genetic-phenotype correlations and natural history including Prader-Willi syndrome (PWSA), the first recognized human disorder with morbid obesity and errors in genomic imprinting which he characterized and now considered the leading international expert.

Butler has also undertaken the study of Angelman, a sister syndrome to Prader-Willi syndrome, as well as fragile X and Burnside- Butler syndromes are considered as recognized genetic causes of autism. These studies have been focused areas of research through his career expanding more than 50 years. Besides the study of the genetics, natural history and clinical delineation of rare syndromes, autism and obesity, he has also invested time in the characterization and treatment of genetic illnesses including the use of pharmacogenetics for the selection of medications to treat disorders based on the patient's DNA patterns that influences medication use, metabolism and treatment success.

Butler was a tenured Associate Professor of Pediatrics and Pathology at Vanderbilt University in Nashville, Tennessee from 1984 to 1998. In 1998 he was appointed Section Chief and an Endowed Chair recipient of Molecular Medicine at Children's Mercy Hospital and Professor at University of Missouri-Kansas City until 2008.

In 2008, he was appointed Professor of Psychiatry & Behavioral Sciences and Pediatrics at the University of Kansas Medical Center and became the Director of the Division of Research and Genetics and Director of the Genetics Clinic. He became Professor Emeritus in 2022 and continues part-time employment.

He served as chair of the Scientific Advisory Board of the Prader-Willi Syndrome Association of the United States of America for 25 years, where he received the 2008 Lifetime Achievement Award. In addition, he was a 1986 recipient of the Distinguished Service Award from Chadron State College in Chadron, Nebraska and 2007 recipient of Indiana University's Distinguished Alumni Award.

He received the University of Kansas Chancellor’s Research Club Award in 2016, Kansas City Top Doctors Award in 2015-2022; Best Doctors in American, the Nelson Lifetime Achievement Award in 2015-2021 by Marquis Who’s Who in America Award in 2021 and the 2021 Gregor Mendel Genetics Award. He also received the Pioneer Award from the Prader-Willi Syndrome Association (PWS|USA) in 2025 for his contributions in diagnosing and treating those affected with this genetic disorder and the study of PWS for a span of 50 years.

== Awards ==
Butler has received recognition for his contributions to medical genetics and genetic testing for rare disorders, particularly his pioneering work on genomic imprinting and Prader–Willi syndrome. He was elected a Founding Fellow of the American College of Medical Genetics and Genomics (ACMG) in 1993 in recognition of his professional achievements in clinical genetics. He was named Top ranking scholar in clinical medicine from Scholar Gps.

He received the Distinguished Service Award from Chadron State College in 1986 and was honored with the Indiana University Distinguished Alumni Award in 2007 for his accomplishments in medical genetics and biomedical research. Numerous other awards and achievements are noted including a two-volume book set dedicated to his research accomplishments on the Career Milestones of a Medical Geneticist from 1978-2019 and 2016-2023 (Volume ii) and A Commemorative Issue in Honor of Professor Merlin G. Butler’s Retirement (Unlocking Genetic Mysteries) 2025.

For his longstanding service to the Prader–Willi syndrome community, Butler received the Lifetime Achievement Award from the Prader-Willi Syndrome Association (USA) in 2008 after serving for approximately twenty-five years as chair of the association's Scientific Advisory Board. He later received the organization's Distinguished Service Award in 2019, recognizing his decades of research, clinical leadership, and advocacy for individuals with Prader–Willi syndrome and their families.

== Research ==
Throughout his career, Butler has focused on the principles of medical genetics, clinical genetics and cytogenetics with development of genetic testing options and approaches. His work was instrumental or utilized in the field of genomic imprinting for human disorders and genetic causation of several complex multisystem neurodevelopmental disorders and autism, delineation of rare genetic disorders along with characterization of congenital anomalies or birth defects, syndromic and non-syndromic obesity and precision medicine. His research has been particularly influential in advancing the understanding of Prader–Willi syndrome (PWS), Angelman syndrome (AS),Mowat wilson syndrome fragile X syndrome, Burnside–Butler syndrome, autism spectrum disorders, Ehlers-Danlos syndromes and genetic forms of obesity

=== Prader–Willi syndrome ===
Butler is regarded as one of the leading researchers on Prader–Willi syndrome and genetics of obesity. His work helped establish PWS as one of the first recognized human disorders caused by genomic imprinting, demonstrating that the syndrome results from the loss of expression of paternally inherited genes on chromosome 15q11–q13. His investigations contributed to improved clinical diagnosis, molecular classification, genotype–phenotype correlations, and multidisciplinary management of the disorder. His recognition and work led to clinical trials in rare disorders and identifying barriers and limitations in treating such disorders such as PWS impacting clinical trial development and use of therapeutic agents when limited natural history and causation are known per disorder.

He has also led studies examining the natural history of Prader–Willi syndrome, endocrine abnormalities, obesity, behavioral characteristics, psychiatric manifestations, sleep disorders, and therapeutic interventions, helping establish internationally recognized clinical management recommendations.

=== Genomic imprinting and rare genetic disorders ===
Beyond Prader–Willi syndrome, Butler has conducted research on the cytogenetic/molecular basis of Angelman, fragile X, Burnside–Butler (15q11.2 BP1–BP2 microdeletion), Ehlers-Danlos and discovery with clinical characterization and role of genetic defect(s) in causation of other rare genetic disorders. His studies have explored chromosomal microdeletions, copy-number variants, and epigenetic mechanisms underlying neurodevelopmental disorders, intellectual disability, and autism spectrum disorder.

=== Autism genetics and pharmacogenetics ===
Butler's later research expanded into the genetics of autism spectrum disorder and precision medicine. He has investigated genetic susceptibility, rare pathogenic variants, and pharmacogenetic approaches for selecting psychiatric medications based on an individual's genetic profile, with the aim of improving treatment outcomes in neurodevelopmental and psychiatric disorders. More recently, he has undertaken integrated in silico analysis of protein-protein interactive networks, involvement of gene-gene pathway associations and functions to better understand the causation of diseases and treatment, congenital cardiac and kidney defects, autism and PTEN gene, addiction and GLP1R agonists in type 2 diabetes and obesity. Gene expression patterns in brain and other tissues using multi-omics approaches involving gene and protein studies in those with PWS and controls are continuing to better understand the molecular and protein disturbances recognized in PWS and relationship with clinical-behavior features seen in PWS when compared with controls are underway and potential role in drug repurposing to identify new therapeutic agents to lessen the severity and improve quality of life for those affected.

== Bibliography ==
- Genetics of Developmental Disabilities. ASIN : B00UVA0RYI
- The Identification of the Genetic Components of Autism Spectrum Disorders 2017. ISBN 978-3038425205
- Genetics of Prader-Willi Syndrome. ISBN 978-3036550251
- Identification and Characterization of Genetic Components in Autism Spectrum Disorders 2020. ISBN 978-3036536118
- Identification and Characterization of Genetic Components in Autism Spectrum Disorders 2019. ISBN 978-3036536095
- Management of Prader-Willi Syndrome 2006 (3rd edition). ISBN 978-0387253978
- Management of Prader-Willi Syndrome 2022 (4th edition).ISBN 9783030981716
- "Career Milestones Of A Medical Geneticist (Volume I: 1978-2019) by Merlin G. Butler 9798334381162| eBay". eBay.
- "A Commemorative Issue in Honor of Professor Merlin G. Butler's Retirement: Unloc 3725830320| eBay". eBay.
- "Career Milestones Of A Medical Geneticist (Uolume-IⅡ: 2016-2023)) by Merlin G. Butler 9798334381162| eBay". eBay. ISBN 979-8329164558.
