= MASS syndrome =

- Other names: Mitral valve-aorta-skeleton-skin syndrome
- This condition is inherited in an autosomal dominant manner
- Specialty: Medical condition

MASS syndrome is a medical disorder of the connective tissue similar to Marfan syndrome. MASS stands for mitral valve prolapse, aortic root diameter at upper limits of normal for body size, stretch marks of the skin, and skeletal conditions similar to Marfan syndrome. It is caused by a mutation in the FBN1 gene, which encodes fibrillin-1. Fibrillin-1 is an extracellular matrix protein that is found in microfibrils; defects in the fibrillin-1 protein cause the malfunctioning of microfibrils, which results in improper stretching of ligaments, blood vessels, and skin.

Treatment options for MASS syndrome are largely determined on a case-by-case basis and generally address the symptoms as opposed to the cause of the disorder. Due to the similarities between MASS syndrome and Marfan syndrome, the treatment plans are also similar.

Other possible symptoms are mitral valve prolapse, a large aortic root diameter, and myopia. The skeletal features found in MASS syndrome include curvature of the spine (scoliosis), chest wall deformities, and joint hypermobility.

MASS syndrome and Marfan syndrome are overlapping connective tissue disorders. Both can be caused by mutations in the gene encoding a protein called fibrillin. These conditions share many of the same signs and symptoms including long limbs and fingers, chest wall abnormalities (indented chest bone or protruding chest bone), flat feet, scoliosis, mitral valve prolapse, loose or hypextensible joints, highly arched roof of the mouth, and mild dilatation of the aortic root. Unlike in Marfan syndrome, aneurysm does not develop.

Individuals with MASS syndrome do not have progressive aortic enlargement or lens dislocation, while people with Marfan syndrome do. Skin involvement in MASS syndrome is typically limited to stretch marks (striae distensae). Also, the skeletal manifestations of MASS syndrome are generally mild.
