= Microspherophakia =

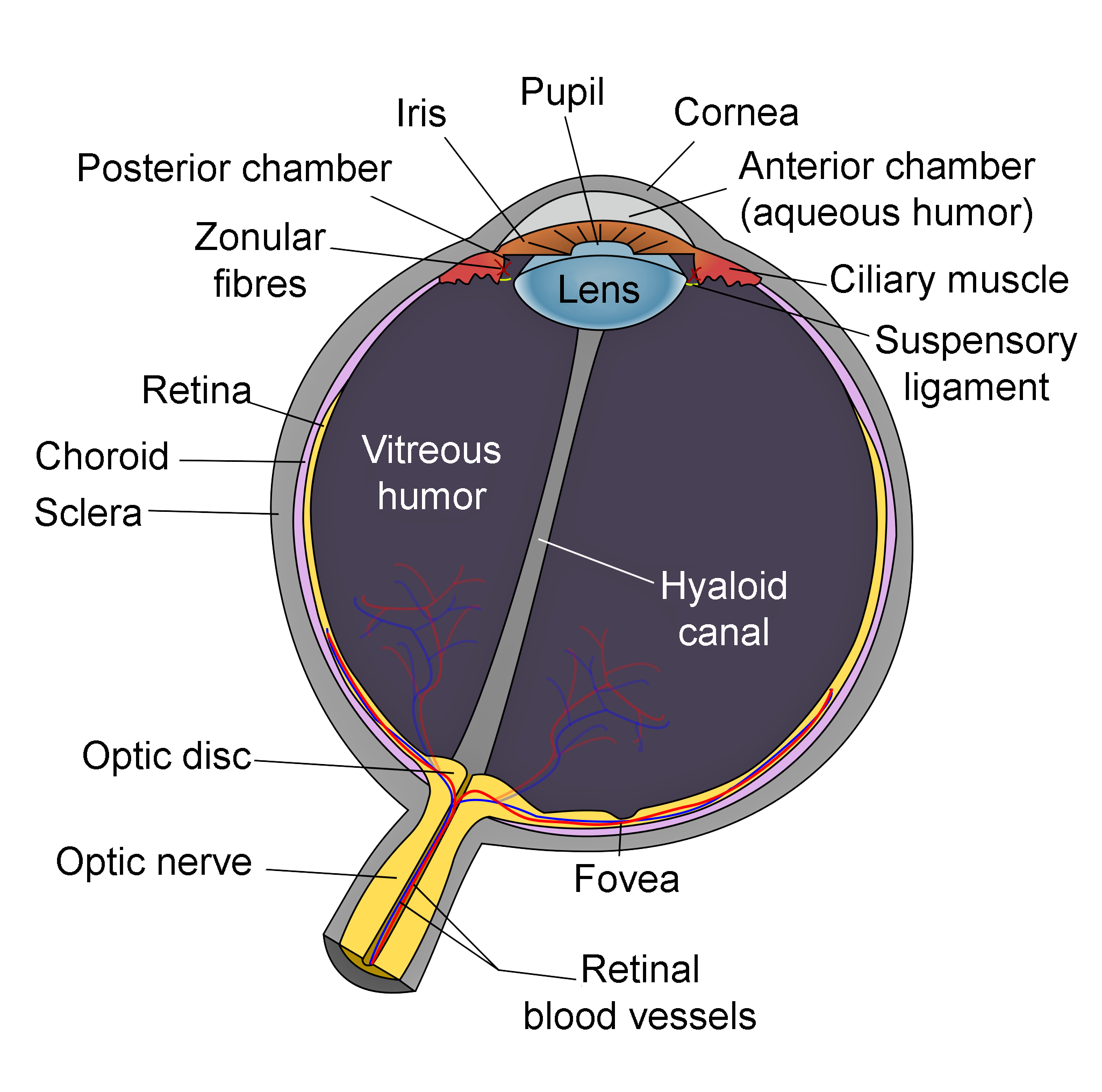
- Schematic diagram of the human eye (normal)
- Specialty: Ophthalmology

Microspherophakia is a rare congenital autosomal recessive condition where the lens of the eye is smaller than normal and spherically shaped. This condition may be associated with a number of disorders including Peter's anomaly, Marfan syndrome, and Weill–Marchesani syndrome. The spherical shape is caused by an underdeveloped zonule of Zinn, which doesn't exert enough force on the lens to make it form the usual oval shape. It is a result of a homozygous mutation to the LTBP2 gene.

== See also ==
- Ectopia lentis
