= ADAMTS10 =

Protein-coding gene in humans

Identifiers
- Aliases: ADAMTS10, ADAM-TS10, ADAMTS-10, WMS, WMS1, ADAM metallopeptidase with thrombospondin type 1 motif 10
- External IDs: OMIM: 608990; MGI: 2449112; GeneCards: ADAMTS10

Gene location (Human)
Chr.	Chromosome 19 (human)
Band	19p13.2	Start	8,580,240 bp
Band	19p13.2	End	8,610,735 bp

Gene location (Mouse)
Chr.	Chromosome 17 (mouse)
Band	17|17 B1	Start	33,743,178 bp
Band	17|17 B1	End	33,772,756 bp
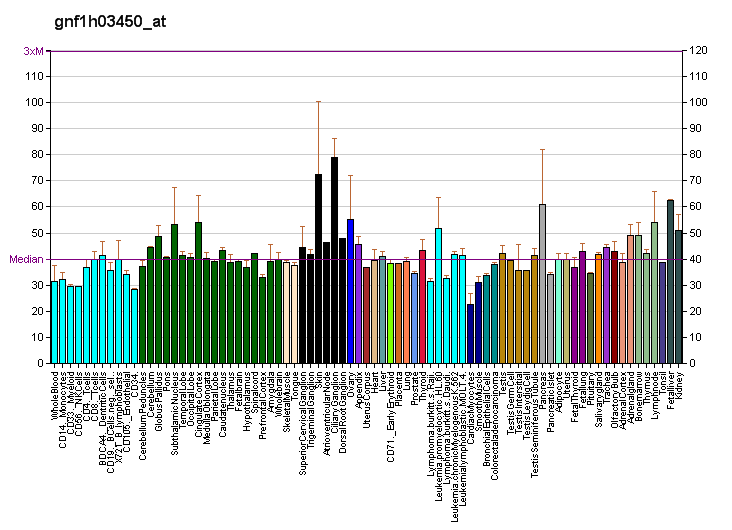

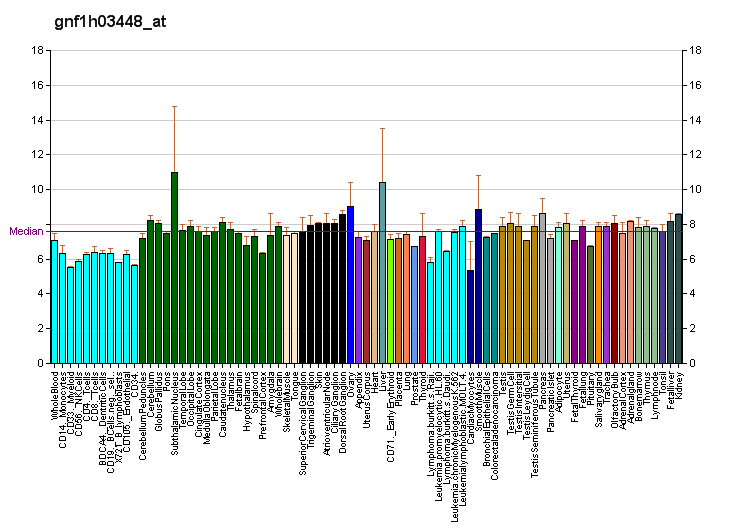

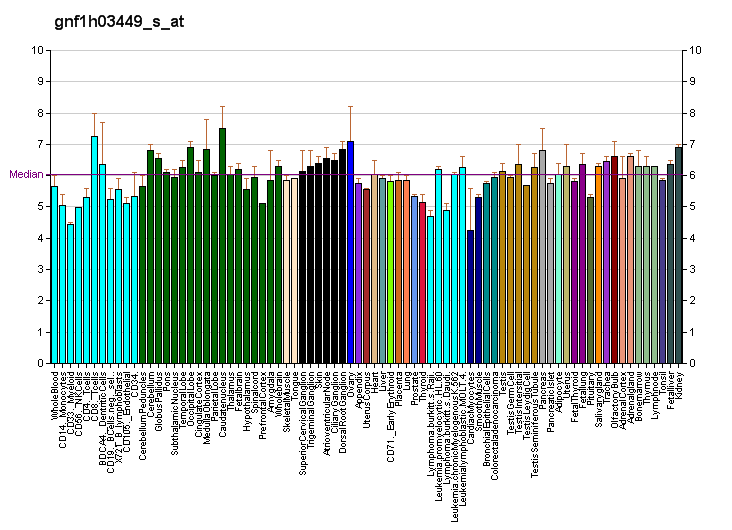
RNA expression pattern
Bgee	Human / Mouse (ortholog); Top expressed in: Descending thoracic aorta; right coronary artery; skin of arm; ascending aorta; nasal epithelium; myocardium of left ventricle; granulocyte; cardiac muscle tissue of right atrium; cerebellar vermis; vena cava / Top expressed in: ascending aorta; aortic valve; granulocyte; left lung; left lung lobe; tail of embryo; external carotid artery; internal carotid artery; genital tubercle; cerebellar cortex; More reference expression data
BioGPS	More reference expression data
Gene ontology
Molecular function	peptidase activity; metalloendopeptidase activity; protein binding; hydrolase activity; metallopeptidase activity; metal ion binding; molecular function
Cellular component	microfibril; extracellular region; extracellular matrix; collagen-containing extracellular matrix
Biological process	proteolysis; biological process
Sources:Amigo / QuickGO
Orthologs
Databases	NCBI: entry; OMA: entry
Species	Human	Mouse
Entrez	81794	224697
Ensembl	ENSG00000142303	ENSMUSG00000024299
UniProt	Q9H324	P58459
RefSeq (mRNA)	NM_001282352; NM_030957	NM_172619; NM_001329143; NM_001329147; NM_001329151; NM_001329152 NM_001329153; NM_001329154; NM_001329202; NM_001329203
RefSeq (protein)	NP_001269281; NP_112219	NP_001316072; NP_001316076; NP_001316080; NP_001316081; NP_001316082 NP_001316083; NP_001316131; NP_001316132; NP_766207
Location (UCSC)	Chr 19: 8.58 – 8.61 Mb	Chr 17: 33.74 – 33.77 Mb
PubMed search
- Wikidata
View/Edit Human	View/Edit Mouse

A disintegrin and metalloproteinase with thrombospondin motifs 10 is an enzyme that in humans is encoded by the ADAMTS10 gene.

This gene belongs to the ADAMTS (a disintegrin and metalloproteinase domain with thrombospondin type-1 motifs) family of zinc-dependent proteases. ADAMTS proteases are complex secreted enzymes containing a prometalloprotease domain of the reprolysin type attached to an ancillary domain with a highly conserved structure that includes at least one thrombospondin type 1 repeat. They have been demonstrated to have important roles in connective tissue organization, coagulation, inflammation, arthritis, angiogenesis and cell migration. The product of this gene plays a major role in growth and in skin, lens, and heart development. It is also a candidate gene for autosomal recessive Weill-Marchesani syndrome.
