= Burnside–Butler syndrome =

- Other names: 15q11.2 BP1-BP2 microdeletion

Burnside–Butler syndrome is a name that has been applied to the effects of microdeletion of DNA sequences involving four neurodevelopmental genes (TUBGCP5, CYFIP1, NIPA1, and NIPA2). Varying developmental and psychiatric disorders have been attributed to the microdeletion; however, the great majority of people with the deletion do not have any clinical features associated with it. More studies are needed to delineate the range of clinical presentation.

The 15q11.2 BP1–BP2 microdeletion (Burnside–Butler syndrome) was the most common cytogenetic abnormality found in a recent study using ultra-high resolution chromosomal microarray analysis optimized for neurodevelopmental disorders of 10,351 consecutive patients presenting for genetic laboratory testing who had autism spectrum disorders (ASD). It may represent an under-recognized contributor to the global prevalence of ASD, which is a common clinical manifestation of many rare genetic disorders, many of which can be identified by chromosome microarray analysis. The 15q11.2 BP1-BP2 microdeletion was reported to account for 9% of the top 85 genetic findings associated with neurodevelopmental disorders followed by the proximal 16p11.2 deletion syndrome (5%). However, the very high frequency of the deletion in unaffected population controls suggests that there is considerable ascertainment bias and that most people who have a neurodevelopmental condition and the deletion are likely to have an alternate cause for their symptoms. In a large population-based study, 1 in 292 people in the general population had this deletion. While the deletion was over-represented in cases vs controls (1 in 126 cases had the deletion) suggesting that it likely does contribute to neurodevelopmental problems in some individuals, the penetrance is likely to be very low. To understand this point, it is important to remember that affected individuals make up only a small proportion of the population. Assuming that 1% have intellectual disability, for example, this would imply penetrance of ~1.3% for the deletion - i.e. 98.7% of people with the deletion would have no symptoms as a result.

This suggests that the term "Burnside–Butler syndrome" should be used with caution, if at all. In the context of low penetrance for a very common variant, it is not surprising that the features that have been attributed to the deletion are highly variable and inconsistent. No consistent set of features has been described that would meet the usual criteria for naming a syndrome, and the use of the term is likely to cause confusion.

== See also ==
- Merlin Butler
