= 16p11.2 duplication syndrome =

- Other names: Proximal 16p11.2 microduplication syndrome
- The inheritance pattern of 16p11.2 duplications is autosomal dominant.
- Specialty: Medical genetics

16p11.2 duplication syndrome is a genetic condition caused by duplication of a specific region on chromosome 16. The odds of developing autism spectrum disorder are elevated and comparable to the rate with 16p11.2 deletion. The rate of having ADHD is higher than in people with deletion.

== Signs and symptoms ==
Individuals with a 16p11.2 duplication may experience intellectual impairment and developmental delay. Roughly one-third of kids with this illness experience delays in learning motor skills like sitting, crawling, or walking. Affected people's average IQ is roughly 26 points lower than their parents' IQ without the duplication. Roughly 80% of individuals with a 16p11.2 duplication experience speech or language difficulties. It may have an impact on both receptive and expressive language abilities.

ADHD is among the most prevalent behavioral issues linked to this chromosomal alteration. Approximately one in five individuals with a 16p11.2 duplication are diagnosed with autism spectrum disorder, a condition that impacts social and communication abilities. Additionally, there is a higher chance of mental health issues among affected people, such as sadness, anxiety, and schizophrenia. With this illness, recurrent seizures are conceivable, albeit they are uncommon in the majority of affected persons.

A 16p11.2 duplication can also result in other problems such as renal and urinary system deformities. 16p11.2 duplications do not, however, exhibit a specific pattern of physical anomalies; in fact, the indications and symptoms associated with the chromosomal alteration differ even among afflicted family members.

== Causes ==
A genetic region on the short (p) arm of chromosome 16 at a place known as p11.2 is duplicated in individuals with a 16p11.2 duplication. It is sufficient for a duplication in one copy of chromosome 16 in each cell to generate the disease since 16p11.2 duplications follow an autosomal dominant inheritance pattern.

== Research ==
Researchers at Northwestern University created a mouse model of the syndrome.
