= NIPA2 =

Protein-coding gene in humans

Identifiers
- Aliases: NIPA2, non imprinted in Prader-Willi/Angelman syndrome 2, SLC57A2, NIPA magnesium transporter 2
- External IDs: OMIM: 608146; MGI: 1913918; GeneCards: NIPA2

Gene location (Human)
Chr.	Chromosome 15 (human)
Band	15q11.2	Start	22,838,644 bp
Band	15q11.2	End	22,869,362 bp

Gene location (Mouse)
Chr.	Chromosome 7 (mouse)
Band	7|7 B5	Start	55,581,035 bp
Band	7|7 B5	End	55,612,224 bp
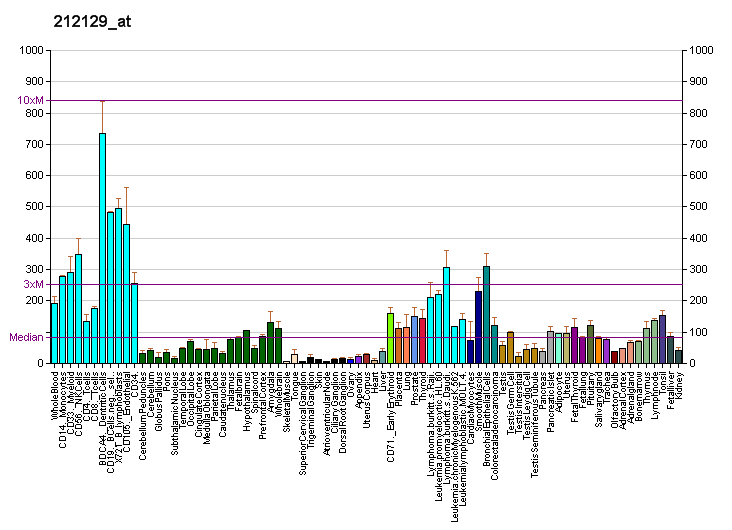

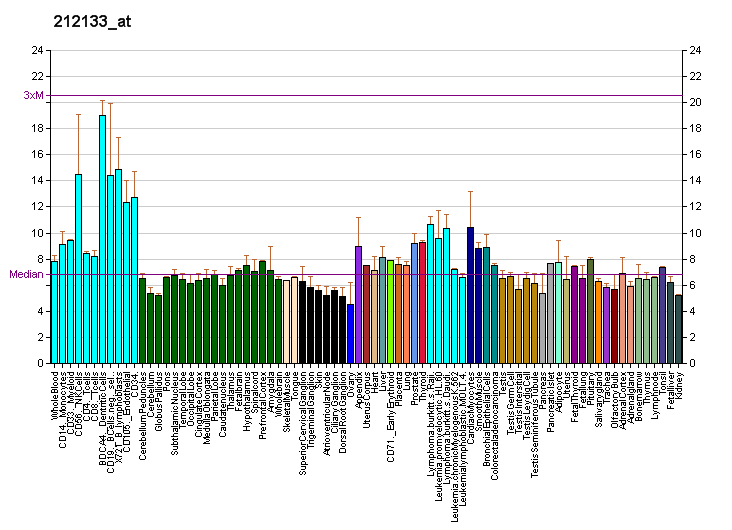
RNA expression pattern
Bgee	Human / Mouse (ortholog); Top expressed in: pancreatic ductal cell; mucosa of colon; mucosa of sigmoid colon; secondary oocyte; mucosa of ileum; nasal epithelium; rectum; right ventricle; islet of Langerhans; duodenum / Top expressed in: epithelium of small intestine; submandibular gland; gastrula; ileum; left colon; transitional epithelium of urinary bladder; interventricular septum; atrioventricular valve; jejunum; epithelium of stomach; More reference expression data
BioGPS	More reference expression data
Gene ontology
Molecular function	magnesium ion transmembrane transporter activity
Cellular component	integral component of membrane; endosome; plasma membrane; early endosome; membrane
Biological process	magnesium ion transmembrane transport; ion transport; magnesium ion transport
Sources:Amigo / QuickGO
Orthologs
Databases	NCBI: entry; OMA: entry
Species	Human	Mouse
Entrez	81614	93790
Ensembl	ENSG00000140157	ENSMUSG00000030452
UniProt	Q8N8Q9	Q9JJC8
RefSeq (mRNA)	NM_001008860; NM_001008892; NM_001008894; NM_001184888; NM_001184889 NM_030922	NM_001256130; NM_001256131; NM_001256132; NM_001256133; NM_023647
RefSeq (protein)	NP_001008860; NP_001008892; NP_001008894; NP_001171817; NP_001171818 NP_112184	NP_001243059; NP_001243060; NP_001243061; NP_001243062; NP_076136
Location (UCSC)	Chr 15: 22.84 – 22.87 Mb	Chr 7: 55.58 – 55.61 Mb
PubMed search
- Wikidata
View/Edit Human	View/Edit Mouse

Non-imprinted in Prader-Willi/Angelman syndrome region protein 2 is a protein that in humans is encoded by the NIPA2 gene.
