= Myhre syndrome =

- Other names: LAPS syndrome, Laryngotracheal stenosis, Arthropathy, Prognathism, and Short stature syndrome
- Myhre syndrome is inherited in an autosomal dominant manner
- Specialty: Medical genetics

Myhre syndrome (MS) is an ultrarare genetic disorder caused by dominant gain-of-function (GOF) mutations in the SMAD4 gene. MS mutations are missense heterozygous mutations affecting only Ile500 or Arg496 residues of the SMAD4 protein. MS patients exhibit manifestations of connective tissue disease including dysfunction of the integumentary, cardiovascular, respiratory, gastrointestinal, and musculoskeletal systems and is often characterized by proliferative systemic fibrosis. Some of these features are life threatening, such as airway or arterial narrowing (laryngotracheal stenosis or aortic coarctation) and fibroproliferation of tissues including lung, heart, and liver. Consistent with these clinical observations, cells isolated from patients with MS demonstrate increased TGF-β signaling.

In contrast, loss-of-function (LOF) mutations in SMAD4 predispose individuals to gastrointestinal polyps, a higher risk of colorectal cancer, and a risk of forming arteriovenous malformations (AVM) a hallmark manifestation of hereditary hemorrhagic telangiectasia (HHT). Patients also have external phenotypes similar to Marfan syndrome.

Biologically, SMAD4 plays a prominent role in both canonical TGF-β and other TGF-β superfamily signaling. The systemic manifestations of these two disorders suggest opposite biologic effects, such as the finding of aortic aneurysm in SMAD4-JP-HHT (LOF of SMAD4) versus the aortic hypoplasia seen in Myhre syndrome (GOF in SMAD4).

== Signs and symptoms ==
The clinical presentation is variable but includes:

- Small at birth
- Developmental and growth delays
- Firm skin
- Keratosis pilaris
- "Athletic" muscular build
- Characteristic facial appearance
- Deafness
- Hyperopia
- Variable cognitive deficits
- Autism spectrum disorders/social disability
- Tracheal stenosis
- Premature puberty
- Heavy menses in females
- Aortic stenosis
- Pyloric stenosis

The facial abnormalities include:

- Short palpebral fissures (opening of the eyes)
- Maxillary hypoplasia (underdevelopment of the upper jaw)
- Prognathism (prominent lower jaw)
- Short philtrum
- Prominent nose

The Musculo-skeletal abnormalities include:

- Short stature
- Stiff joints/stiff gait
- Scoliosis
- Straight spine
- Square body shape
- Broad ribs
- Iliac hypoplasia
- Brachydactyly
- Flattened vertebrae
- Thickened calvaria

Cardiovascular abnormalities include:

- Congenital heart defects
- Atrial septal defect
- Ventricular septal defect
- Patent ductus arteriosus
- Tetralogy of Fallot
- Aortic coarctation
- Aortic stenosis
- Mitral valve stenosis
- Aortic hypoplasia
- Pericardial effusion
- Pericarditis
- Restrictive cardiomyopathy

Other anomalies

- Undescended testes in males

== Genetics ==
Myhre syndrome is due to mutations in the SMAD4 gene. This gene encodes a protein - transducer mediating transforming growth factor beta. Some researchers believe that the SMAD4 gene mutations that cause Myhre syndrome impair the ability of the SMAD4 protein to attach (bind) properly with the other proteins involved in the signaling pathway. Other studies have suggested that these mutations result in an abnormally stable SMAD4 protein that remains active in the cell longer. Changes in SMAD4 binding or availability may result in abnormal signaling in many cell types, which affects development of several body systems and leads to the signs and symptoms of Myhre syndrome.

The patients of this disease exhibit hypertrophic phenotype in their muscle tissues. Myostatin target genes are found to be downregulated while bone morphogenetic protein (BMP) target genes display both upregulated and downregulated genotypes.

== Diagnosis ==
The diagnosis of Myhre syndrome is established in a proband with characteristic clinical findings and a heterozygous pathogenic (or likely pathogenic) variant in SMAD4 detected by molecular genetic testing. Because Myhre syndrome is typically caused by a de novo pathogenic variant, most probands represent a simplex case (i.e., a single occurrence in a family). Rarely, the family history may be consistent with autosomal dominant inheritance (e.g., affected males and females in multiple generations).

== Treatment ==
There are currently no disease specific therapies, although the use of losartan has been suggested to prevent fibrosis.

== History ==
This disorder was first reported in 1981. It has many similarities to LAPS Syndrome and they both arise from the same mutations in the SMAD4 gene. It is believed that they are the same syndrome.
