= Zinc finger protein basonuclin-2 =

Protein found in humans

BNC2

Identifiers
- Aliases: BNC2, BSN2, basonuclin 2, LUTO
- External IDs: OMIM: 608669; MGI: 2443805; GeneCards: BNC2

Gene location (Human)
Chr.	Chromosome 9 (human)
Band	9p22.3-p22.2	Start	16,409,503 bp
Band	9p22.3-p22.2	End	16,870,843 bp

Gene location (Mouse)
Chr.	Chromosome 4 (mouse)
Band	4|4 C3- C4	Start	84,193,332 bp
Band	4|4 C3- C4	End	84,593,512 bp
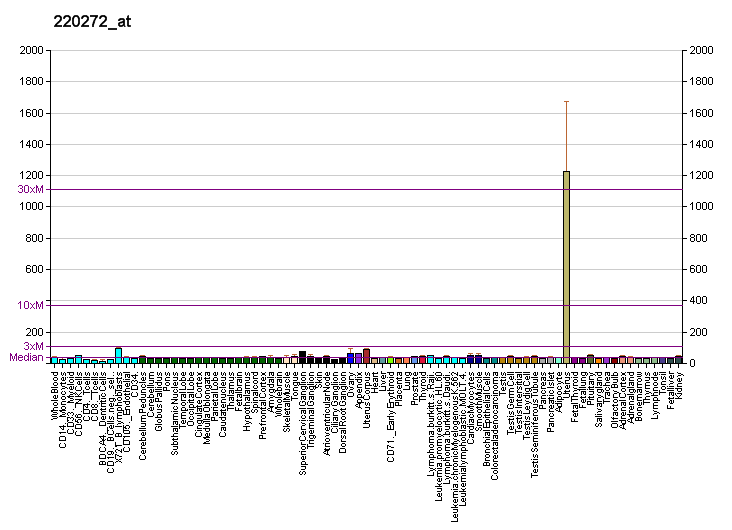
RNA expression pattern
Bgee	Human / Mouse (ortholog); Top expressed in: germinal epithelium; sural nerve; parietal pleura; epithelium of colon; hair follicle; buccal mucosa cell; left ovary; right ovary; myometrium; testicle / Top expressed in: zygote; oocyte; secondary oocyte; primary oocyte; Gonadal ridge; vas deferens; sciatic nerve; lumbar spinal ganglion; hand; trigeminal ganglion; More reference expression data
BioGPS	More reference expression data
Gene ontology
Molecular function	metal ion binding; DNA binding; nucleic acid binding; DNA-binding transcription factor activity, RNA polymerase II-specific
Cellular component	nucleus; nucleoplasm; plasma membrane; cytosol
Biological process	tongue development; endochondral bone growth; regulation of transcription, DNA-templated; mesenchyme development; roof of mouth development; transcription, DNA-templated; regulation of transcription by RNA polymerase II
Sources:Amigo / QuickGO
Orthologs
Databases	NCBI: entry; OMA: entry
Species	Human	Mouse
Entrez	54796	242509
Ensembl	ENSG00000173068	ENSMUSG00000028487
UniProt	Q6ZN30; Q06HC2	Q8BMQ3
RefSeq (mRNA)	NM_017637; NM_001317939; NM_001317940	NM_172870; NM_001369081; NM_001369082; NM_001369083; NM_001369084
RefSeq (protein)	NP_001304868; NP_001304869; NP_060107	NP_766458; NP_001356010; NP_001356011; NP_001356012; NP_001356013
Location (UCSC)	Chr 9: 16.41 – 16.87 Mb	Chr 4: 84.19 – 84.59 Mb
PubMed search
- Wikidata
View/Edit Human	View/Edit Mouse

Zinc finger protein basonuclin-2 is a protein that in humans is encoded by the BNC2 gene. BNC2 has recently been shown to influence skin pigmentation levels in Europeans. Genomic region spanning the BNC2 gene has 60% Neanderthal DNA sequence.

== See also ==
- Chromosome 9 (human)
- Zinc finger protein
