= MFAP2 =

Protein-coding gene in humans

Identifiers
- Aliases: MFAP2, MAGP, MAGP-1, MAGP1, microfibrillar associated protein 2, microfibril associated protein 2
- External IDs: OMIM: 156790; MGI: 99559; GeneCards: MFAP2

Gene location (Human)
Chr.	Chromosome 1 (human)
Band	1p36.13	Start	16,974,502 bp
Band	1p36.13	End	16,980,632 bp

Gene location (Mouse)
Chr.	Chromosome 4 (mouse)
Band	4|4 D3	Start	140,737,729 bp
Band	4|4 D3	End	140,743,295 bp
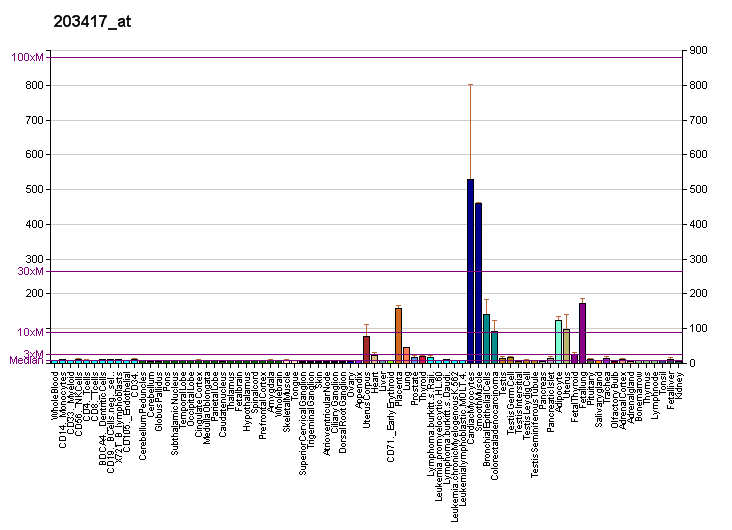
RNA expression pattern
Bgee	Human / Mouse (ortholog); Top expressed in: stromal cell of endometrium; ventricular zone; gallbladder; canal of the cervix; right coronary artery; ganglionic eminence; placenta; Descending thoracic aorta; ascending aorta; body of uterus / Top expressed in: efferent ductule; dermis; ventricular zone; maxillary prominence; external carotid artery; internal carotid artery; vestibular sensory epithelium; hand; mandibular prominence; umbilical cord; More reference expression data
BioGPS	More reference expression data
Gene ontology
Molecular function	extracellular matrix structural constituent
Cellular component	microfibril; extracellular region; collagen-containing extracellular matrix
Biological process	embryonic eye morphogenesis; post-embryonic eye morphogenesis; extracellular matrix organization; positive regulation of cold-induced thermogenesis
Sources:Amigo / QuickGO
Orthologs
Databases	NCBI: entry; OMA: entry
Species	Human	Mouse
Entrez	4237	17150
Ensembl	ENSG00000117122	ENSMUSG00000060572
UniProt	P55001	P55002; Q99PM0
RefSeq (mRNA)	NM_001135247; NM_001135248; NM_002403; NM_017459	NM_001161799; NM_008546; NM_001369292
RefSeq (protein)	NP_001128719; NP_001128720; NP_002394; NP_059453	NP_001155271; NP_032572; NP_001356221
Location (UCSC)	Chr 1: 16.97 – 16.98 Mb	Chr 4: 140.74 – 140.74 Mb
PubMed search
- Wikidata
View/Edit Human	View/Edit Mouse

Microfibrillar-associated protein 2 is a protein that in humans is encoded by the MFAP2 gene.

Microfibrillar-associated protein 2 is a major antigen of elastin-associated microfibrils and a candidate for involvement in the etiology of inherited connective tissue diseases. This gene encodes two transcripts with two alternatively spliced 5' untranslated exons. These two transcripts contain the same eight coding exons, and therefore, encode the same protein.
