= Weill–Marchesani syndrome =

Rare generic disorder

- Other names: Spherophakia-brachymorphia syndrome, congenital mesodermal dystrophy, GEMSS syndrome
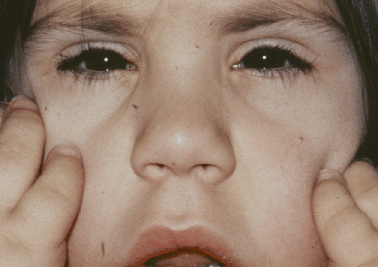
- A six-year-old girl with Weill-Marchesani syndrome, which has caused a dislocated lens.
- Specialty: Ophthalmology, rheumatology, medical genetics

Weill–Marchesani syndrome is a rare genetic disorder characterized by short stature; an unusually short, broad head (brachycephaly) and other facial abnormalities; hand defects, including unusually short fingers (brachydactyly); and distinctive eye (ocular) abnormalities. It was named after ophthalmologists Georges Weill (1866–1952) and Oswald Marchesani (1900–1952) who first described it in 1932 and 1939, respectively.

The eye manifestations typically include unusually small, round lenses of the eyes (microspherophakia), which may be prone to dislocating (ectopia lentis), as well as other ocular defects. Due to such abnormalities, affected individuals may have varying degrees of visual impairment, ranging from nearsightedness myopia to blindness. Weill–Marchesani syndrome may have autosomal recessive inheritance involving the ADAMTS10 gene, or autosomal dominant inheritance involving the FBN1 gene. In some cases there is no association with either of these genes.

== Diagnosis ==
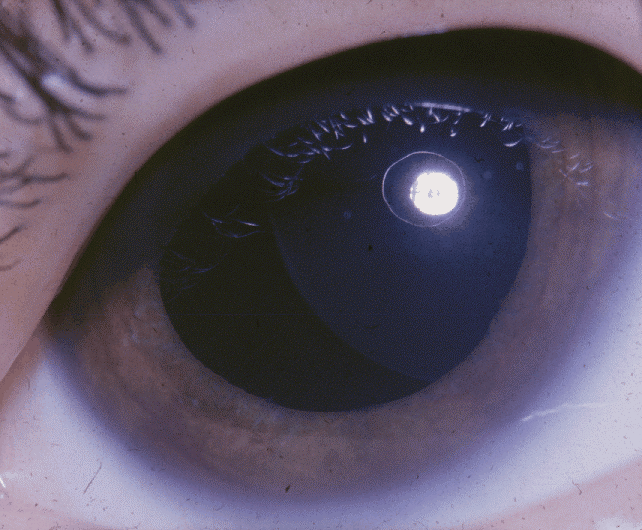
A lens dislocation caused by Weill-Marchesani syndrome

Diagnosis is made when several characteristic clinical signs are observed. There is no single test to confirm the presence of Weill–Marchesani syndrome. Exploring family history or examining other family members may prove helpful in confirming this diagnosis.

== Treatment ==
Eye surgery has been documented to help those with ocular diseases, such as some forms of glaucoma.

== Prognosis ==
However, long term medical management of glaucoma has not proven to be successful for patients with Weill–Marchesani syndrome. Physical therapy and orthopedic treatments are generally prescribed for problems stemming from mobility from this connective tissue disorder. However, this disorder has no cure, and generally, treatments are given to improve quality of life.

== See also ==
- ADAMTS17
- LTBP2
