= Fibrillin =

Protein family

fibrillin 1
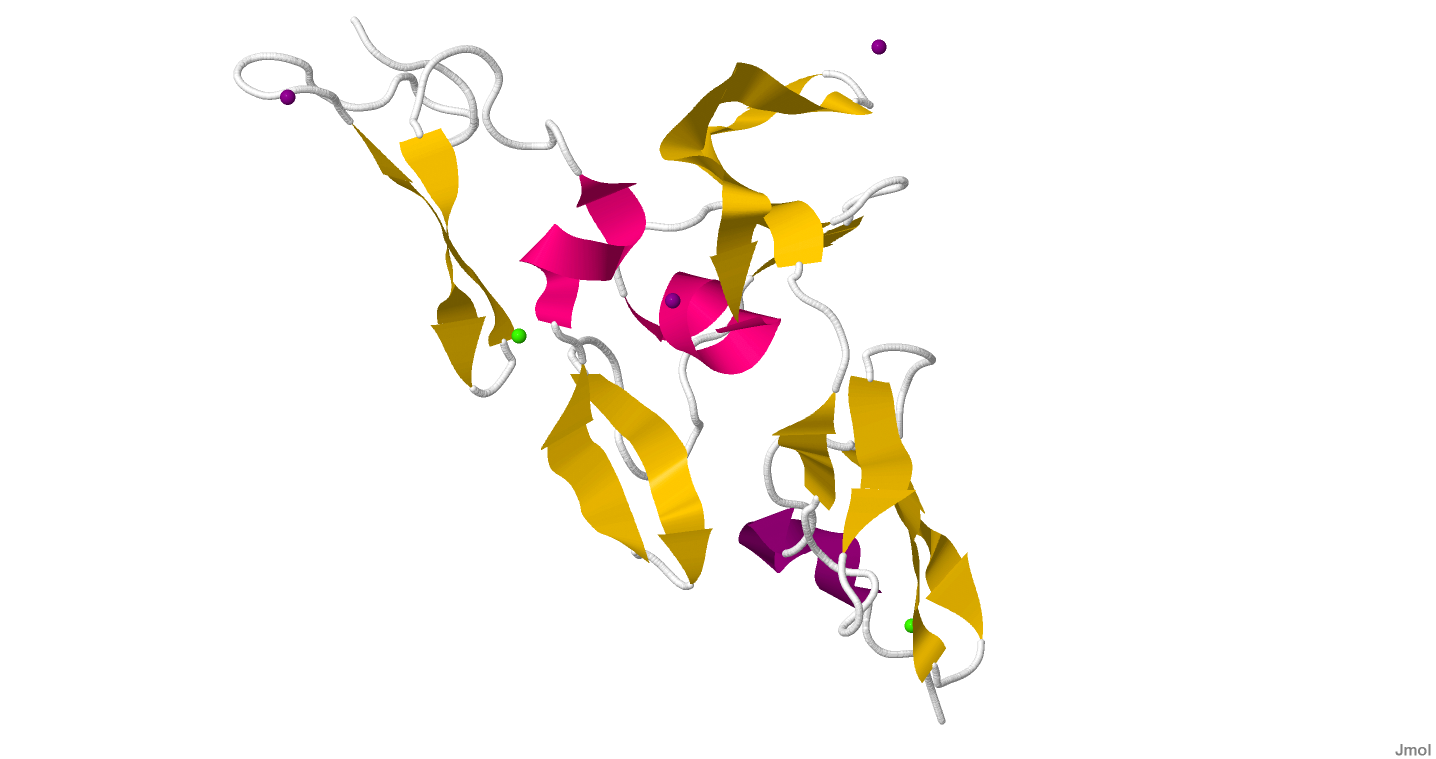
- Crystallographic structure of the cbEGF9-hybrid2-cbEGF10 region of human fibrillin 1.

Identifiers
- Symbol: FBN1
- Alt. symbols: FBN, MFS1, WMS
- NCBI gene: 2200
- HGNC: 3603
- OMIM: 134797
- PDB: 2W86
- RefSeq: NM_000138
- UniProt: P35555

Other data
- Locus: Chr. 15 q21.1
Search for
- Structures: Swiss-model
- Domains: InterPro

fibrillin 2

Identifiers
- Symbol: FBN2
- Alt. symbols: CCA
- NCBI gene: 2201
- HGNC: 3604
- OMIM: 121050
- RefSeq: NM_001999
- UniProt: P35556

Other data
- Locus: Chr. 5 q23-q31
Search for
- Structures: Swiss-model
- Domains: InterPro

fibrillin 3

Identifiers
- Symbol: FBN3
- NCBI gene: 84467
- HGNC: 18794
- OMIM: 608529
- RefSeq: NM_032447
- UniProt: Q75N90

Other data
- Locus: Chr. 19 p13
Search for
- Structures: Swiss-model
- Domains: InterPro

Fibrillin is a glycoprotein, which is essential for the formation of elastic fibers found in connective tissue. Fibrillin is secreted into the extracellular matrix by fibroblasts and becomes incorporated into the insoluble microfibrils, which appear to provide a scaffold for deposition of elastin.

== Clinical aspects ==
Marfan syndrome is a genetic disorder of the connective tissue caused by defected FBN1 gene. Mutations in FBN1 and FBN2 are also sometimes associated with adolescent idiopathic scoliosis.

== Types ==
=== Fibrillin-1 ===
Fibrillin-1 is a major component of the microfibrils that form a sheath surrounding the amorphous elastin. It is believed that the microfibrils are composed of end-to-end polymers of fibrillin. To date, 3 forms of fibrillin have been described. The fibrillin-1 protein was isolated by Engvall in 1986, and mutations in the FBN1 gene cause Marfan syndrome.

This protein is found in humans, and its gene is found on chromosome 15. At present more than 1500 different mutations have been described.

==== Structure ====
There is no complete, high-resolution structure of fibrillin-1. Instead, short fragments have been produced recombinantly and their structures solved by X-ray crystallography or using NMR spectroscopy. A recent example is the structure of the fibrillin-1 hybrid2 domain, in context of its flanking calcium binding epidermal growth factor domains, which was determined using X-ray crystallography to a resolution of 1.8 Å. The microfibrils that are made up of fibrillin protein are responsible for different cell-matrix interactions in the human body.

=== Fibrillin-2 ===
Fibrillin-2 was isolated in 1994 by Zhang and is thought to play a role in early elastogenesis. Mutations in the fibrillin-2 gene have been linked to Beals syndrome.

=== Fibrillin-3 ===
More recently, fibrillin-3 was described and is believed to be located mainly in the brain. Along with the brain, fibrillin-3 has been localized in the gonads and ovaries of field mice.

=== Fibrillin-4 ===
Fibrillin-4 was first discovered in zebrafish, and has a sequence similar to fibrillin-2.
