= Microfibril =

Fiber-like protein strand

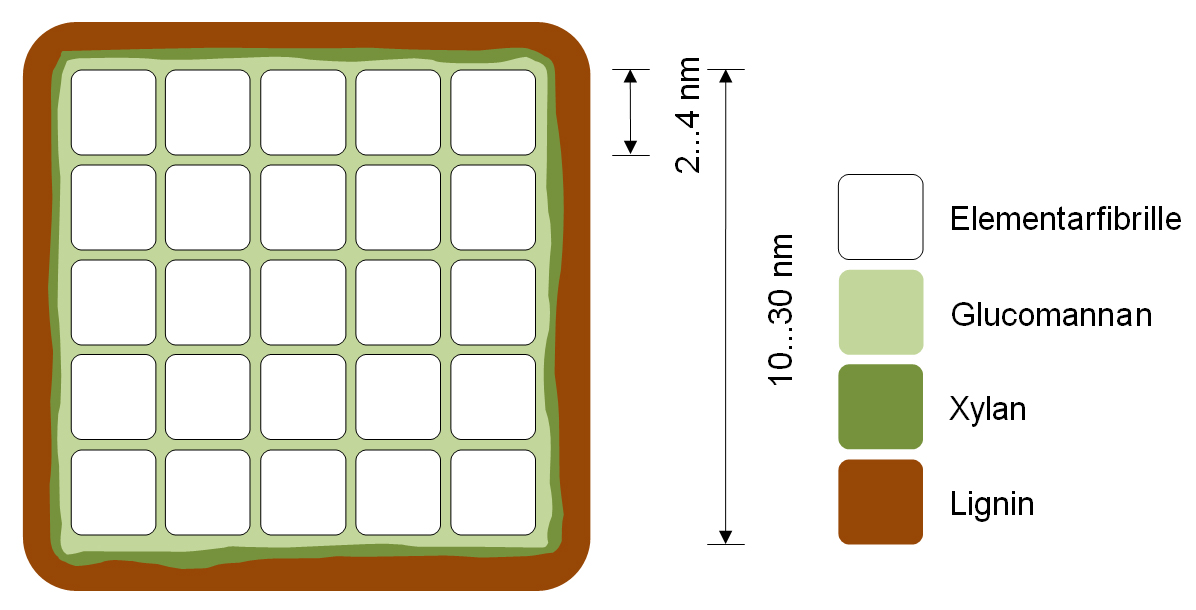
Schematic cross-section of a microfibril

A microfibril is a very fine fibril, or fiber-like strand, consisting of glycoproteins and cellulose. It is usually, but not always, used as a general term in describing the structure of protein fiber, e.g. hair and sperm tail. Its most frequently observed structural pattern is the 9+2 pattern in which two central protofibrils are surrounded by nine other pairs. Cellulose inside plants is one of the examples of non-protein compounds that are using this term with the same purpose. Cellulose microfibrils are laid down in the inner surface of the primary cell wall. As the cell absorbs water, its volume increases and the existing microfibrils separate and new ones are formed to help increase cell strength.

== Synthesis and function ==
Cellulose is synthesized by cellulose synthase or Rosette terminal complexes which reside on a cells membrane. As cellulose fibrils are synthesized and grow extracellularly they push up against neighboring cells. Since the neighboring cell can not move easily the Rosette complex is instead pushed around the cell through the fluid phospholipid membrane. Eventually this results in the cell becoming wrapped in a microfibril layer. This layer becomes the cell wall. The organization of microfibrils forming the primary cell wall is rather disorganized. However, another mechanism is used in secondary cell walls leading to its organization. Essentially, lanes on the secondary cell wall are built with microtubules. These lanes force microfibrils to remain in a certain area while they wrap. During this process microtubules can spontaneously depolymerize and repolymerize in a different orientation. This leads to a different direction in which the cell continues getting wrapped.

Fibrillin microfibrils are found in connective tissues, which mainly makes up fibrillin-1 and provides elasticity. During the assembly, mirofibrils exhibit a repeating stringed-beads arrangement produced by the cross-linking of molecules forming a striated pattern with a given periodicity when viewed stained under an electron microscope. In the formation of elastic fiber, fibrillin microfibrils guides the deposit of tropoelastin and remains in the outer layer of mature elastin fibers. The microfibril is also associated in cell communication. Formation of fibrillin microfibrils in the pericellular region affects the activity of a growth factor called TGFβ.

== Marfan syndrome ==
In Marfan syndrome, a connective tissue disorder, mutations in the gene encoding for the fibrillin-1 protein impact nearly every one of its domains. Such defects in fibrillin-1 affect the signaling of TGFβ, as microfibrils directly govern the activity of TGFβ. This hinders the formation of the extracellular matrix, and ultimately results in a severe phenotype which involves a few organ systems, including the central nervous system, circulatory system, ocular system, and skeletal system.

== See also ==
- Fibril
