= Fibrillin-1 =

Protein found in humans

FBN1
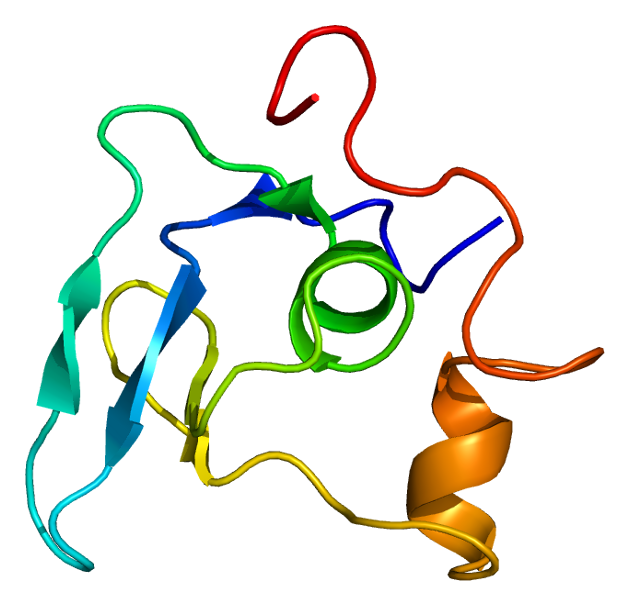

Identifiers
- Aliases: FBN1, ACMICD, ECTOL1, FBN, GPHYSD2, MASS, MFS1, OCTD, SGS, SSKS, WMS, WMS2, MFLS, fibrillin 1
- External IDs: OMIM: 134797; MGI: 95489; GeneCards: FBN1
Available structures
PDB	Ortholog search: PDBe RCSB
PDB	List of PDB id codes 1APJ, 1EMN, 1EMO, 1LMJ, 1UZJ, 1UZK, 1UZP, 1UZQ, 2M74, 2W86

Gene location (Human)
Chr.	Chromosome 15 (human)
Band	15q21.1	Start	48,408,313 bp
Band	15q21.1	End	48,645,721 bp

Gene location (Mouse)
Chr.	Chromosome 2 (mouse)
Band	2 F1|2 61.38 cM	Start	125,142,514 bp
Band	2 F1|2 61.38 cM	End	125,349,913 bp
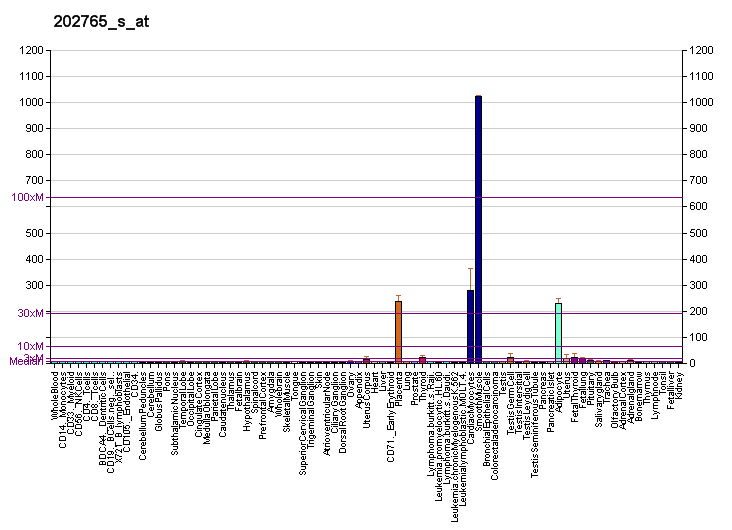

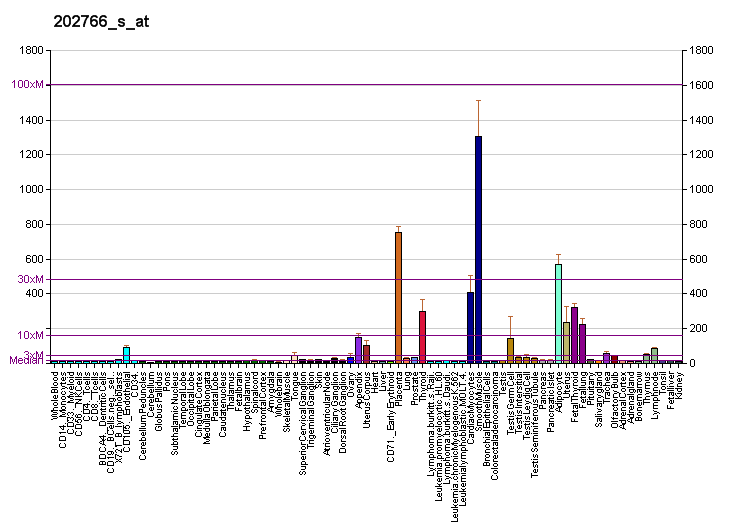
RNA expression pattern
Bgee	Human / Mouse (ortholog); Top expressed in: synovial joint; skin of hip; decidua; stromal cell of endometrium; vulva; pericardium; periodontal fiber; vena cava; parietal pleura; saphenous vein / Top expressed in: external carotid artery; ascending aorta; umbilical cord; semi-lunar valve; aortic valve; gastrula; internal carotid artery; ciliary body; dermis; efferent ductule; More reference expression data
BioGPS	More reference expression data
Gene ontology
Molecular function	calcium ion binding; extracellular matrix constituent conferring elasticity; protein-containing complex binding; extracellular matrix structural constituent; integrin binding; protein binding; hormone activity; heparin binding; identical protein binding
Cellular component	extracellular matrix; basement membrane; extracellular exosome; intracellular anatomical structure; extracellular region; microfibril; extracellular space; endoplasmic reticulum lumen; collagen-containing extracellular matrix
Biological process	cellular response to transforming growth factor beta stimulus; skeletal system development; kidney development; embryonic eye morphogenesis; post-embryonic eye morphogenesis; cellular response to insulin-like growth factor stimulus; extracellular matrix disassembly; extracellular matrix organization; development of the heart; camera-type eye development; metanephros development; regulation of cellular response to growth factor stimulus; protein kinase A signaling; activation of protein kinase A activity; glucose metabolic process; cell adhesion mediated by integrin; glucose homeostasis; sequestering of BMP in extracellular matrix; sequestering of TGFbeta in extracellular matrix; negative regulation of osteoclast differentiation; negative regulation of osteoclast development; post-translational protein modification; regulation of signaling receptor activity; signal transduction
Sources:Amigo / QuickGO
Orthologs
Databases	NCBI: entry; OMA: entry
Species	Human	Mouse
Entrez	2200	14118
Ensembl	ENSG00000166147	ENSMUSG00000027204
UniProt	P35555	Q61554
RefSeq (mRNA)	NM_000138	NM_007993
RefSeq (protein)	NP_000129	NP_032019
Location (UCSC)	Chr 15: 48.41 – 48.65 Mb	Chr 2: 125.14 – 125.35 Mb
PubMed search
- Wikidata
View/Edit Human	View/Edit Mouse

Fibrillin-1 is a protein that in humans is encoded by the FBN1 gene, located on chromosome 15. It is a large, extracellular matrix glycoprotein that serves as a structural component of 10–12 nm calcium-binding microfibrils. These microfibrils provide force bearing structural support in elastic and nonelastic connective tissue throughout the body. Mutations altering the protein can result in a variety of phenotypic effects differing widely in their severity, including fetal death, developmental problems, Marfan syndrome or in some cases Weill-Marchesani syndrome.

== Gene ==
FBN1 is a 230-kb gene with 65 coding exons that encode a 2,871-amino-acid long proprotein called profibrillin which is proteolytically cleaved near its C-terminus by the enzyme furin convertase to give fibrillin-1, a member of the fibrillin family, and the 140-amino-acid long protein hormone asprosin.

== Structure ==
The sequence of fibrillin-1 includes 47 six-cysteine EGF-like domains, 7 eight-cysteine domains homologous with latent TGF-beta binding protein, and a proline-rich region.

== Function ==
=== Fetal cardiovascular development ===
The FBN-1 gene is involved in a variety of embryonic developmental programs. The microfibrils that are made from fibrillin-1 contribute to both elastic and non-elastic structures. The formation of the elastic fibers in the heart valves and the aorta require the involvement of both FBN-1 and FBN-2. It has been shown that both FBN-1 and FBN-2, along with the other components of elastic fibers, are expressed in the embryonic semilunar valves as early as 4 weeks of gestation. These molecules interact to form the elastic fibers in the ventricularis layer of the semilunar valves. Fibrillin-1 and fibrillin-2 are also crucial for the development of elastic fibers in the aorta. While expression of fibrillin-2 decreases significantly after fetal development, the expression of fibrillin-1 continues into adulthood. This supports the idea that fibrilin-2 dictates the development of early elastic fibers, while fibrillin-1 provides the structural support of mature elastic fibers.

When mutations in the FBN-1 or FBN-2 genes occur, significant deformations can result from the damage to the extracellular matrix. Marfan syndrome is a congenital disease that arises from a mutation in the FBN-1 gene. This leads to the malformation and subsequent weakening of the microfibrils in the patient’s body, including the structures of the cardiovascular system. The weakened elastic fibers will result in an impaired durability and distensibility in the heart valves and aorta. This provides the explanation for the aortic aneurysms and prolapsed valves that are commonly associated with Marfan syndrome.

== Clinical significance ==
Mutations in the FBN1 gene are associated with Marfan syndrome and its variant Marfanoid–progeroid–lipodystrophy syndrome, autosomal dominant Weill–Marchesani syndrome, isolated ectopia lentis, MASS phenotype, and Shprintzen–Goldberg syndrome.

Mutations in FBN1 and FBN2 are associated with adolescent idiopathic scoliosis.

Clinical symptoms of MFS such as aortic root dilation, pulmonary emphysema, atrioventricular valve changes and skeletal muscle myopathy are induced by altered TGF-β activation and signalling. Aortic specific symptoms are closely related to excessive TGF-β signalling in the aortic root wall. TGF-β antagonism via systemic administration of TGF-β neutralising antibody (NAb) averted the development of aortic pathologies associated with MDS, more specifically changes in the aortic wall and progressive aortic dilation. Antagonism of TGF-β also further reduced MFS symptoms where it helped muscle regeneration, architecture and strength, pulmonary alveolar septation and mitral valve morphology.

=== Mutations ===
FBN1 is a gene approximately 200kb and is made up of a large coding sequence divided into 65 exons located on chromosome 15. This gene encodes for Fibrillin-1 protein. Fibrillin-1 is a large cysteine rich-glycoprotein approximately 350 kDa mainly composed of tandemly repeating domains of epidermal growth factor (EGF)-like modules. These domains are homologous to calcium binding epidermal growth factor module (cbEGF-like motifs) and of distinct 8-cysteine modules to make up elastic and non-elastic tissue. These elastic and non-elastic tissues are microfibrillar bundles, heteropolymers of both Fibrillin-1 and fibrillin-2. Elastogenesis is a biological process where microfibrils and elastic fibres are self-assembled via organised deposition by several macromolecules. Polymerised fibrillins can be characterised by their ‘beads-on-a-string’ microfibril structure; giving rise to a microfibril lattice via lateral communication of the individual polymers and structural components.

Fibrillin-1 mutations are the main mutated protein causing MFS. This mutation usually interferes with the assembly of microfibrils resulting in a dominant-negative mechanism

Mutations can include:

1. Missense mutations caused by single base substitutions such as cysteine or those associated with calcium binding in Fibrillin-1.
2. Premature terminations caused by nonsense mutations or frameshifts.
3. Mutations within the exonic splice site allowing for insertions or deletions due to creations of cryptic splice sites.
4. Intronic splice site base changes leading to alternative splicing and in-frame exon skipping or deletion.

The combination of the four types of mutations results in Fibrillin-1 being expressed incorrectly. There is no correlation between phenotype and genotype at a molecular level

The mutations of the FBN-1 gene at six chromosomal loci, TAAD1 at 5q13-14, FAA1 at 11q23-24, TAAD2 at 3p24-25, TAAD3 at 15q24-26, TAAD4 at 10q23-24 and MYH11 at 16p12-13 are known to be triggers of MFS. These loci tend to have genes that are involved in vascular function. The MYH11 gene is responsible for the smooth muscle myosin heavy chain and ACTA2 at TAAD4 loci encodes for smooth muscle alpha-actin.

A nonsynonymous amino acid change affecting conserved cysteine of the CaB-EGF-like domain encoded by exon 13 of the FBN1 gene can cause MFS to develop. Higher frequency and severity of MFS occurs when there are incorrect substitutions at the C1–C2 or C3–C4 disulphide bonds, therefore, correct cysteine localisation and disulphide bonding at these loci are critical to structural integrity. Mutations in the FBN1 gene resulting in incorrect bonding at the C5–C6 disulphide bond generally results in MFS of lesser severity. Concentrated mutations of the CaB-EGF domain along the FBN1 polypeptide affects MFS severity phenotype. Localised substitution mutations of the cysteine substitution at C538P on exon 13, C570R on exon 14 or C587Y on exon 15 result in MFS symptoms related to the eyes, specifically ectopia lentis. Microfibrils themselves can support the hemodynamic load in the circulatory systems of invertebrates and lesser vertebrates. Elastin and the development of the ECM system integrated with surrounding VSMC are needed for higher vertebrates to function correctly. Fibrillin-1 is not essential in the stabilisation of the elastic unit but instead in the assembly of the microfibril. Up-regulation of activin A works in conjunction with Fibrillin-1 and TGF-β signalling molecules to produce a fibroproliferative response. CYR61 induction also functions to support cell adhesion and regulate matrix remodelling and is fundamental in the formation of large vessels and their integrity.

Common variants in FBN1 can have effects on the gene and human phenotypes as well. For example, a common variant in Peruvian populations (E1297G) can cause a 2.2 cm reduction in height.

=== Marfan syndrome ===
Marfan syndrome (MFS) is an autosomal dominant disorder that affects the connective tissues of bodily systems such as the eyes, cardiovascular system, skeletal system, skin, pulmonary system and the dura. MFS affects approximately 1 in 5,000 individuals. MFS is not an easily diagnosed pathology with a scoring system called the Ghent nosology table used, rather than a single molecule test. To diagnose MFS individuals that have no previous family history, two criteria must be met. Firstly, two different major organ systems must be affected, and secondly, a third organ system must be involved.

MFS has a large hereditary component, with 80% of cases being inherited. The remaining 20% of MFS cases occur from de novo mutations (new germline mutations not inherited from either parent) and results in the individual phenotypically displaying long and thin limbs and extremities, a curved spine usually resulting in thoracic scoliosis, hyperflexible joints, pectus excavatum (sunken chest), and retinal detachment. De Novo mutations resulting in severe MFS have high expected mortality rates for neonates. Classical MFS symptoms usually become noticeable during puberty or later in life; rarely does it develop in the earlier stages of life. The most common skin manifestation of MFS is striae distensae where bands of skin are coloured red, purple and then white. The skin epidermis is thin and flattened, and the upper protective skin layer is decreased in thickness. This manifestation is characterised histologically by straight, thin collagen bundles arranged in a parallel to the skin and the elastic fibres. Elastic fibres are denser in the upper dermis, and beneath this zone there is a localised absence of the elastic fibres. Between the borders of the striae and skin, there are curled, broken, reticular elastic fibres sometimes present. These symptoms are responsible for cobweblike skin appearances in patients with MFS.

Management of MFS covers many aspects, and includes lifestyle advice, physiotherapy, medication and surgery. Management of MFS includes counselling on lifestyle to reduce and restrict physical activity, endo prophylaxis, serial imaging the aorta, β-blocker medication for aortic protection and prophylactic replacement of the aortic root. In MFS affected adults, it is recommended they reduce emotional and physical stress and switch from high impact sports such as martial arts, football, basketball etc to isotonic, low impact exercise such as swimming, biking or jogging where the pulse rate lies approximately at <110 beats per minute. Children should also follow similar guidelines to ensure correct management of MFS.

MFS is caused by a mutation in the FBN1 gene positioned at chromosome 15q21.1 resulting in a deconstructed form of Fibrillin-1. Fibrillin-1 is a 350-kDa, 2871-amino acid cystine-rich glycoprotein that is responsible for the amalgamation of elastin into the elastic fibres of the connective tissue in the extracellular matrix (ECM). The fragility of the connective tissue usually results in aortic aneurysms due to the wall having the inability to withstand intraluminal pressure. Defects in fibrillin-1 results in elevated TGF-β levels that directly correlate to MFS.

=== Role of TGF-β ===
Transforming growth factor beta (TGF-β) is a paracrine regulatory protein responsible for embryonic processing, cell growth, apoptosis induction, and enhances collagen production and ECM remodelling. In a non-MFS affected individual, the TGF-β protein is secreted from the cell to stimulate PAI-1 production and Smad2 phosphorylation. The TGF-β protein binds with latency associated protein (LAP) at the N-terminal properties and one of three latent TGF-β binding proteins (LTBP1, 3 or 4) to form a small latent complex (SLC). SLC then binds extracellularly to latent TGF-β binding protein (LTBP) forming a large latent complex (LLC), which includes an active cytokine. The LLC attaches to the microfibrils of Fibrillin-1 via LTBP, allowing the preservation of inactive TGF-β [6]. TGF-β can only be activated through a series of regulated mechanisms; maintaining correct functioning in embryonic development. Mutations in Fibrillin-1 cause elevated levels of TGF-β in the EC space due to LLC being unable to attach to the microfibrils and latent forms not being produced. TGF-β forms a complex with its dimer receptors, to initiate a phosphorylation cascade. This phosphorylation can cause failures such as an aortic aneurysm and prolapsed valves.

Clinical symptoms of MFS such as aortic root dilation, pulmonary emphysema, atrioventricular valve changes and skeletal muscle myopathy are induced by altered TGF-β activation and signalling. Aortic specific symptoms are closely related to excessive TGF-β signalling in the aortic root wall. TGF-β antagonism via systemic administration of TGF-β neutralising antibody (NAb) averted the development of aortic pathologies associated with MDS, more specifically changes in the aortic wall and progressive aortic dilation. Antagonism of TGF-β also further reduced MFS symptoms where it helped muscle regeneration, architecture and strength, pulmonary alveolar septation and mitral valve morphology.

LLC that fails to be removed from the ECM is more vulnerable to be activated in a protease-dependent or independent manner. MMP2 and MMP9 are select TGF-β activators and ligands and are found in higher levels in the tissues of patients affected with MFS. TGF-β in its complex and free-form can leach into the circulation due to the mutated ECM sequestration and increased LLC activation.

=== Losartan ===
Losartan is an angiotensin II type 1 (AT1) receptor blocker known to antagonise TGF-β signalling via inhibiting the expression and activation of TGF-β. Losartan can work independently or with β-blocker therapy to reduce rate of change in the aortic root diameter of MFS pathology.

== See also ==
- Fibrillin
