= Recurrent toxin-mediated perineal erythema =

- Specialty: Infectious diseases

Recurrent toxin-mediated perineal erythema is an unusual condition that presents 2–3 days after a throat infection as a fine diffuse macular erythema of the perineal region.

== See also ==
- Brill–Zinsser disease
- List of cutaneous conditions
