= Gertrud Hurler =

German pediatrician

- Born: 1 September 1889; Taberwiese, East Prussia, German Empire (now Taborzec, Poland)
- Died: 1965 (aged 76)
- Education: Ludwig-Maximilians-Universität München (M.D.)
- Spouse: Konrad Hurler
- Scientific career
- Fields: Pediatrics
- Workplaces: Hauner Children's Hospital

Gertrud Hurler, née Zach (1 September 1889 – 1965), was a German pediatrician who wrote up a disease that came to be known as Hurler syndrome and a lesser version which is known as Hurler–Scheie syndrome.

== Life ==
Gertrud Hurler was born in Taberwiese, East Prussia, German Empire (now Taborzec, Poland) on 1 September 1889. She was educated in Königsberg, East Prussia (now Kaliningrad, Russia), before getting her M.D. degree at the Ludwig-Maximilians-Universität München. She married Konrad Hurler, a veterinary surgeon, in 1914, and they had a daughter and a son together. Her example inspired her husband to get his own medical certificate. During her post-graduate training in pediatrics at Hauner Children's Hospital, she observed two infants that displayed symptoms of corneal clouding, dwarfing skeletal dysplasia, spinal misalignment, and mental retardation. Previously known as gargoylism or lipochondrodystrophy, the disease was named after her, despite the initial report being given by her chief, Professor von Pfaundler, to the Munich Pediatric Society. Hurler wrote up the case in German: Über einen Typ multipler Abartungen, vorwiegend am Skelettsystem that was published in the Zournal Kinderheilk in 1919. That same year she started a private practice as a pediatrician in Neuhausen that lasted until her death in 1965.
