= Von Zumbusch acute generalized pustular psoriasis =

Severe and rare form of psoriasis

- Specialty: Dermatology
- Named after: Leo Ritter von Zumbusch

Von Zumbusch acute generalized pustular psoriasis (acute GPP) is the most severe form of generalized pustular psoriasis, and can be associated with life-threatening complications.

== Signs and symptoms ==
Patients with acute GPP experience the eruption of multiple isolated sterile pustules generalized over the body, recurrent fevers, fatigue, and laboratory abnormalities (elevated ESR, elevated CRP, combined with leukocytosis).

== Diagnosis ==
Kogoj's spongiform pustules can be observed via histopathology to confirm acute GPP.

== Treatment ==
Acute GPP typically requires inpatient management including both topical and systemic therapy, and supportive measures. Systemic glucocorticoid withdrawal is a common causative agent. Withdrawal or administration of certain drugs in the patient's previous medication regimen may be required. Oral retinoids are the most effective treatment, and are considered first line. Cyclosporine or infliximab may be required for particularly acute cases.

== History ==
The disorder has been named after Leo Ritter von Zombusch, who first described two cases of a brother and a sister in 1910. The patients experienced patterns of redness and pustule formation over several years, often associated with use of topical medications. Unfortunately one of the two siblings died from complications of the disease.
