= Ruth Illig =

Swiss pediatric endocrinologist

Ruth Illig (12 November 1924 – 26 June 2017) was a Swiss pediatric endocrinologist and a professor of pediatrics at the University of Zurich.

== Biography ==
Illig was born in 1924 in Nuremberg, Germany, and moved to Switzerland as an adolescent during the Second World War. After studying medicine, she undertook a residency in pediatrics under Guido Fanconi at the University Children's Hospital in Zürich. She worked there 1956 to 1987, during which time she established the hospital's endocrinology laboratory. She developed techniques for measuring growth hormone and insulin levels, and her thyroid stimulating hormone (TSH) assay was used in the first Swiss national screening program for congenital hypothyroidism, beginning in 1977. Her primary research interest was in the hypothalamic and pituitary endocrine pathways in children with growth and pubertal disorders. She collaborated with Andrea Prader.

Illig became a full professor of the University of Zurich in 1977. She was a founding member of the European Society for Pediatric Endocrinology and she received the society's Outstanding Clinician Award in 2006. She died on 26 June 2017.
