= Pott's puffy tumor =

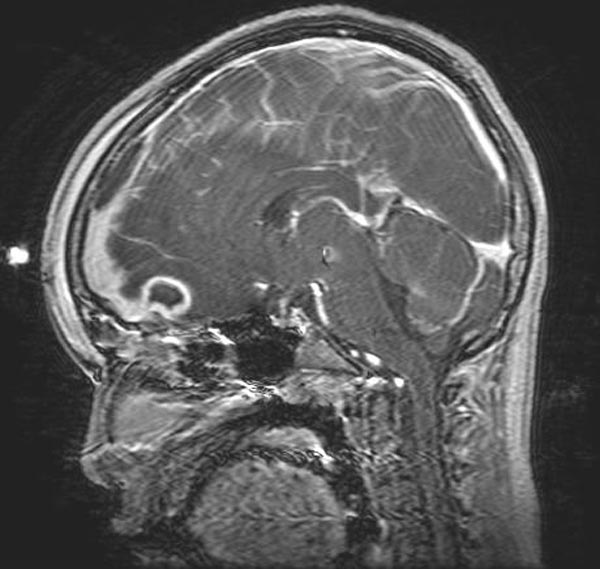
- Pott's puffy tumor, spreading towards person's brain. MRI, T1, sagittal, gadolinium contrast.
- Specialty: Otolaryngology, Neurosurgery

Pott's puffy tumor, first described by Sir Percivall Pott in 1760, is a rare clinical entity characterized by subperiosteal abscess associated with osteomyelitis. It is characterized by an osteomyelitis of the frontal bone, either direct or through haematogenic spread. This results in a swelling on the forehead, hence the name. The infection can also spread inwards, leading to an intracranial abscess. Pott's puffy tumor can be associated with cortical vein thrombosis, epidural abscess, subdural empyema, and brain abscess.

The cause of vein thrombosis is explained by venous drainage of the frontal sinus, which occurs through diploic veins, which communicate with the dural venous plexus; septic thrombi can potentially evolve from foci within the frontal sinus and propagate through this venous system. This type of chronic osteomyelitis of the frontal bone is confused with acute sub-periosteal abscess of the frontal bone, which presents as a discrete collection over the frontal sinus.

Although it can affect all ages, it is mostly found among teenagers and adolescents. It is usually seen as a complication of frontal sinusitis or trauma. Medical imaging can be of use in the diagnosis and evaluation of the underlying cause and extent of the condition. Ultrasound is able to identify frontal bone osteomyelitis, while computed tomography (CT) can evaluate bony erosion, and along with magnetic resonance imaging (MRI), can better appreciate the underlying cause and extent of possible intra-cranial extension/involvement.

== Cause ==
- Frontal sinusitis, acute or chronic.
- Frontal trauma, usually blunt.
- Some cases have been seen in a context of intranasal substance abuse (cocaine, methamphetamine).
- Post-surgical: after frontal sinus reconstruction.

== Diagnosis ==
Diagnosis is suspected clinically and is confirmed using cross sectional imaging of the sinuses and brain. The patient typically presents with a headache overlying the frontal sinuses and an associated forehead swelling. This is often preceded by a history of chronic rhinosinusitis.

Plain X Rays can be used to demonstrate the location of this swelling, but the gold standard for diagnosis is a cross sectional CT scan of the sinuses and brain, aided by contrast to delineate the abscess itself.

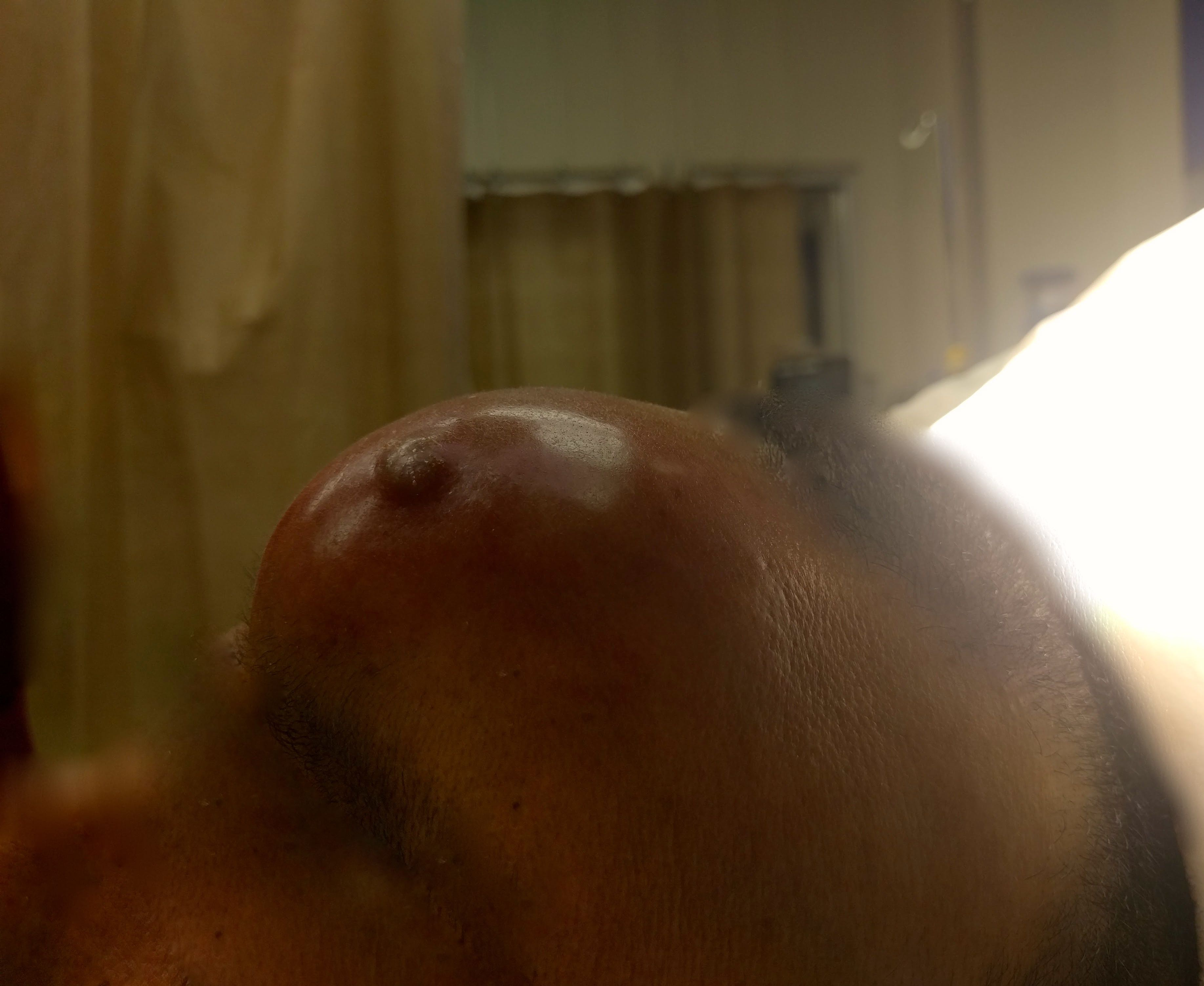
Picture demonstrating associated forehead swelling in patient with Pott’s puffy tumor.

== Treatment ==
The patient requires admission for intravenous anti-microbial treatment. Definitively, the abscess is drained via a combination of open and/or endoscopic approaches by an otolaryngologist, with the exact approach dependent on surgical skill set. At the very least, the abscess is trephined externally as an emergency. Any associated frontal sinus table fracture can be managed electively. Intracranial extension requires referral to the neurosurgery.

== See also ==
- Cock's peculiar tumour
- Squamous-cell carcinoma
