= Knud Krabbe =

Danish neurologist (1885–1961)

Knud Haraldsen Krabbe (3 March 1885 – 8 May 1961) was a Danish neurologist. In 1916, he first described what is now known as Krabbe disease. He was considered a major figure in Nordic Neurology.
