= Diogenes syndrome =

Behavioral disorder

- Other names: Senile squalor syndrome
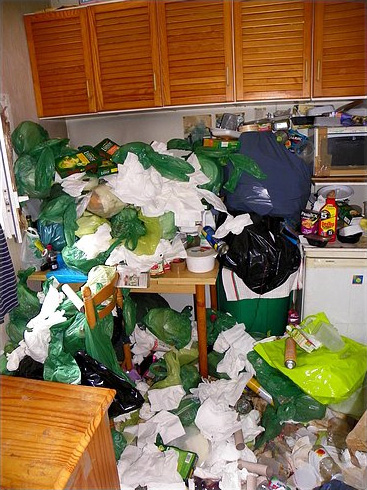
- Room crammed with garbage
- Specialty: Psychology, psychiatry

Diogenes syndrome, also known as senile squalor syndrome, is a disorder characterized by extreme self-neglect, domestic squalor, social withdrawal, apathy and compulsive hoarding of garbage or animals. Affected people may also display symptoms of catatonia.

The condition was first recognized in 1966 and designated Diogenes syndrome by Doctor A. N. G. Clark et al. The name derives from Diogenes of Sinope, an ancient Greek philosopher, a Cynic and an ultimate minimalist, who allegedly lived in a large jar in Athens. Not only did he not hoard, but he actually sought human company by venturing daily to the Agora. Therefore, this eponym is considered to be a misnomer. Other possible terms are senile breakdown, Plyushkin's syndrome (after the Gogol character), social breakdown, and senile squalor syndrome. Frontal lobe impairment may play a part in the causation.

== Presentation ==
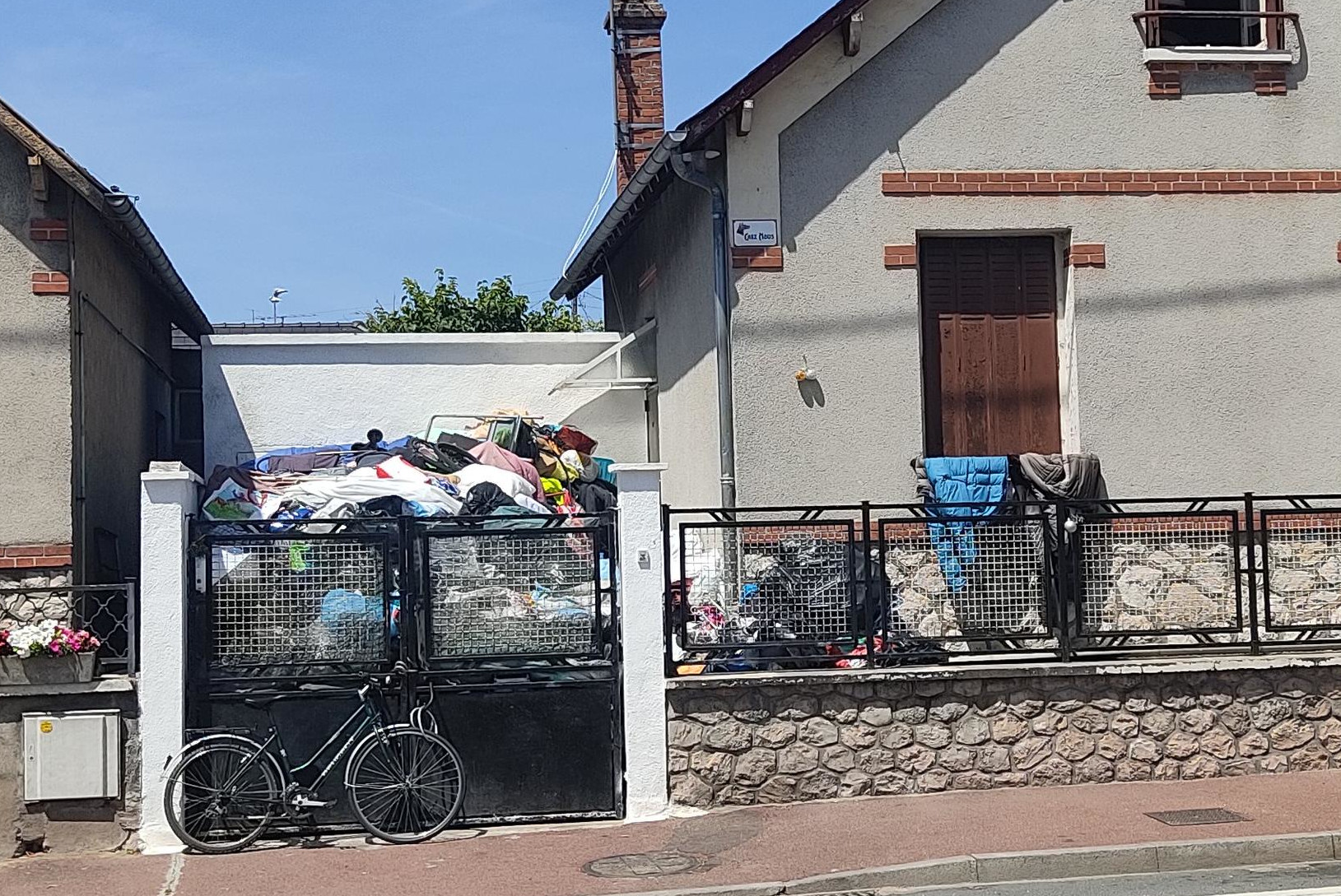
Manifestation of Diogenes syndrome in the backyard of a house

Diogenes syndrome is a disorder that involves hoarding of rubbish and severe self-neglect. In addition, the syndrome is characterized by domestic squalor, syllogomania, social alienation, and refusal of help. It has been shown to occur as a reaction to stress, oftentimes late in life.

In most instances, patients were observed to have an abnormal possessiveness and patterns of complication in a disordered manner. These symptoms suggest damage to the prefrontal areas of the brain, due to its relation to decision making. In contrast, there have also been cases where the hoarded objects were arranged in a methodical manner, which may suggest a cause other than brain damage. Undiagnosed autism may also be a factor.

Although most patients have been observed to come from homes with poor conditions, and many had been faced with poverty for a long period of time, these similarities are not considered a definite cause to the syndrome. Research showed that some of the participants with the condition had solid family backgrounds as well as successful professional lives. Half of the patients were of higher intelligence level.

The severe neglect that they bring on themselves usually results in physical collapse or mental breakdown. Most individuals with the syndrome do not get identified until they face this stage of collapse, due to their predilection to refuse help from others. Or until a crisis occurs, eg. a house fire.

Personality traits that can be seen frequently in patients diagnosed with Diogenes syndrome are aggressiveness, stubbornness, suspicion of others, unpredictable mood swings, emotional instability and deformed perception of reality. Secondary DS is related to mental disorders. The direct relation of the patients' personalities to the syndrome is unclear, though the similarities in character suggest potential avenues for investigation.

== Diagnosis ==
Individuals with Diogenes syndrome generally display signs of collectionism, hoarding, or compulsive disorder. Individuals who have had damage to the brain, particularly the frontal lobe, may be at more risk to developing the syndrome. The frontal lobes are of particular interest, because they are known to be involved in higher order cognitive processes, such as reasoning, decision-making and conflict monitoring. Diogenes syndrome tends to occur among the elderly. People with this disorder tend to have significant functional problems correlated with morbidity and mortality.

== Management ==
Dealing with diagnosed patients is ethically difficult, as many of them deny their poor conditions and refuse to accept treatment. The main objectives of the doctors are to help improve the patient's lifestyle and wellbeing, so health care professionals must decide whether to force treatment onto their patient.

In some cases, especially those including the inability to move, patients may be required to accept help, since they cannot manage to look after themselves. Hospitals or nursing homes are often considered the best treatment under those conditions.

When under care, patients must be treated in a way in which they can learn to trust the health care professionals. In order to do this, the patients should be restricted in the number of visitors they are allowed, and be limited to one nurse or social worker. Some patients respond better to psychotherapy, while others to behavioral treatment or terminal care.

Results after hospitalization tend to be poor. Research on the mortality rate during hospitalization has shown that approximately half the patients die while in the hospital. A quarter of the patients are sent back home, while the other quarter are placed in long-term residential care. Patients under care in hospitals and nursing homes often slide back into relapse or face death.

There are other approaches to improve the patient's condition. Day care facilities have often been successful with maturing the patient's physical and emotional state, as well as helping them with socialization. Other methods include services inside the patient's home, such as the delivery of food.

== History ==
The origin of the syndrome is unknown. A. N. G. Clarke et al. used the term "Diogenes syndrome" in the mid‑1970s and it has been commonly used since then. However, as far back as the 18th century Charles Mason (1698-1770) was likened to "a true modern Diogenes in manners and apparel, coarse and slovenly to excess in both ; the witty made a butt of him, but the scientific caressed him ; he could ornament a subject at the same time that he disgusted and disgraced Society". Diogenes syndrome was acknowledged more prominently as a media phenomenon in popular media rather than medical literature. The primary description of this syndrome has only been mentioned recently by geriatricians and psychiatrists.

== See also ==
- Borderline personality disorder
- Obsessive–compulsive disorder
- Collyer brothers
- Hoarding disorder
