= Charles Foix =

French internist and neurologist

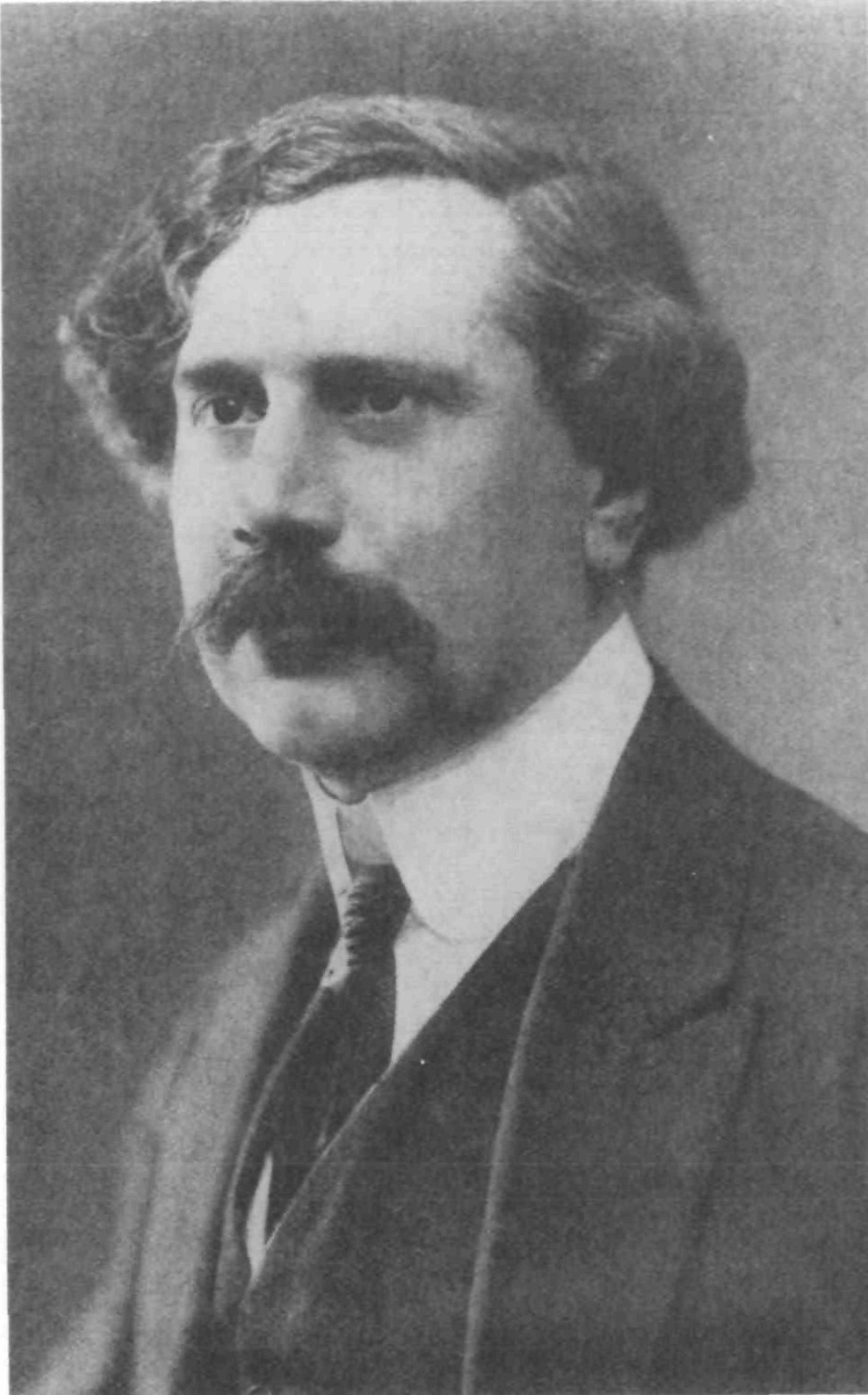
Charles Foix (1882–1927)

Charles Foix (French: [fwa]; 1 February 1882 – 22 March 1927) was a French internist and neurologist.

Charles Foix was born in Salies-de-Béarn, Pyrénées-Atlantiques. He studied medicine at the University of Paris and was a pupil of Pierre Marie at the Salpêtrière Hospital (Paris). He was an intern in 1906, Médecin des hôpitaux in 1919 and became agrégé in 1923.

Foix taught at Georges Guillain's clinic at the Salpêtrière and at Émile Achard's at the Beaujon Hospital, always distinguishing himself by his wide knowledge and rational approach.

Foix' main contributions to the neurology was to relate thrombosis of specific arteries at autopsies with symptoms and signs that he had established in his patients and he wrote a book on the blood supply and anatomy of the brain. With Ion Niculescu he published an imposing treatise on the anatomy and blood supply of the midbrain and interbrain.

Being a teacher and clinician, Foix was almost as much at home with general medicine as he was with neurology. He was also a poet and a lyricist.

== Associated eponyms ==
- Foix's syndrome I, Red nucleus (anterior portion) syndrome.
- Foix's syndrome II, ophthalmoplegic disease secondary to intracranial aneurysms or thrombosis of the cavernous sinus.
- Foix–Alajouanine syndrome, softening of the grey matter of the spinal cord with obliterative sclerosis of the small vessels.
- Foix–Chavany–Marie syndrome, form of pseudobulbar palsy due to damage to the operculum bilaterally.
- Marie–Foix–Alajouanine syndrome, ataxia of the cerebellum in advanced age, frequently due to abuse of alcohol.
- Schilder–Foix disease, Nonprogressive sclerotic lesions of the white matter of the cerebral hemisphere.
