= Nathan Edwin Brill =

American physician

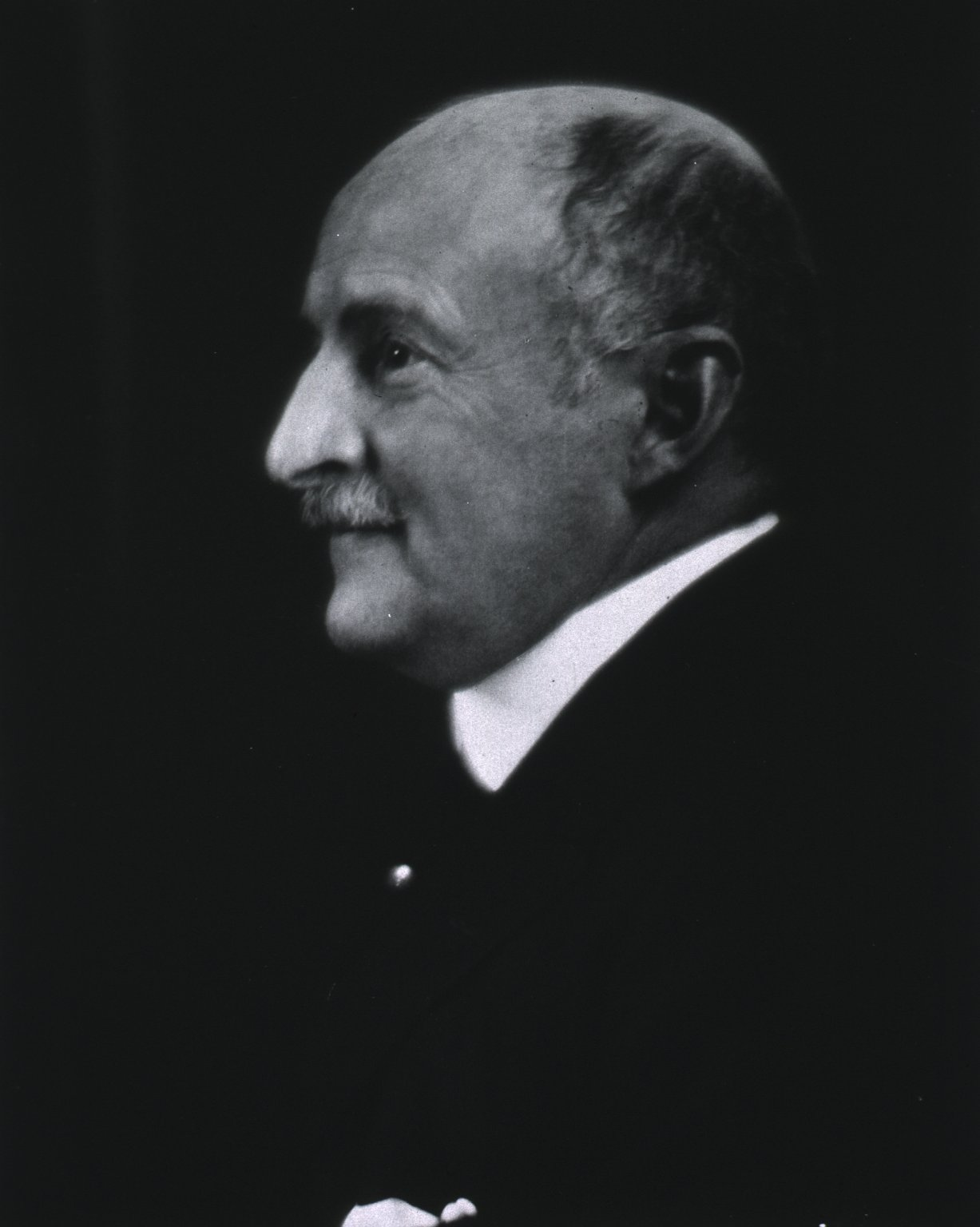
Nathan E. Brill

Nathan Edwin Brill (January 3, 1860– December 13, 1925) was an American physician who, while at Mount Sinai Hospital in New York City, discovered Brill-Zinsser disease (or, often, simply Brill's disease), a late relapse of epidemic typhus.

== Biography ==
Brill was born in New York City and earned his medical degree at New York University College in 1880. He completed his internship at the Bellevue Hospital in 1881.

In 1882 he was appointed physician at the Mount Sinai Hospital, later becoming professor at the Columbia University College of Physicians and Surgeons.

Brill's medical accomplishments include:

- The discovery of Brill-Zinsser disease, the recurrent mild typhus in immigrants from Eastern Europe; Brill determined the disease to be a latent infection after earlier contact with lice or ticks;
- The coining (with Frederick S. Mandlebaum) of the term Gaucher's disease and Brill's recognition of it as a lipid storage disease;
- Description of a form of lymphoma that became known as Brill-Symmers disease.
- The translation of Clinical Diagnosis by Georg Klemperer in 1898.

== Brill-Zinsser Disease ==
Brill-Zinsser Disease (commonly known as Brill's Disease) is a form of epidemic typhus that occurs only in patients who have previously been infected by Rickettsia prowazekiithat was most likely transmitted to the body through lice. Brill's Disease itself is not related to the presence of louse, but instead appears randomly many years after the original infection. The same symptoms seen in patients with epidemic typhus are seen in patients with Brill's Disease, only in less severe form. Brill's Disease can affect patients for the entirety of their lives, with cases being documented after more than forty years of contracting epidemic typhus.
