= William R. Smith (physician) =

American physician

Will R. Smith MD, Paramedic, FAEMS Colonel, US Army Reserve
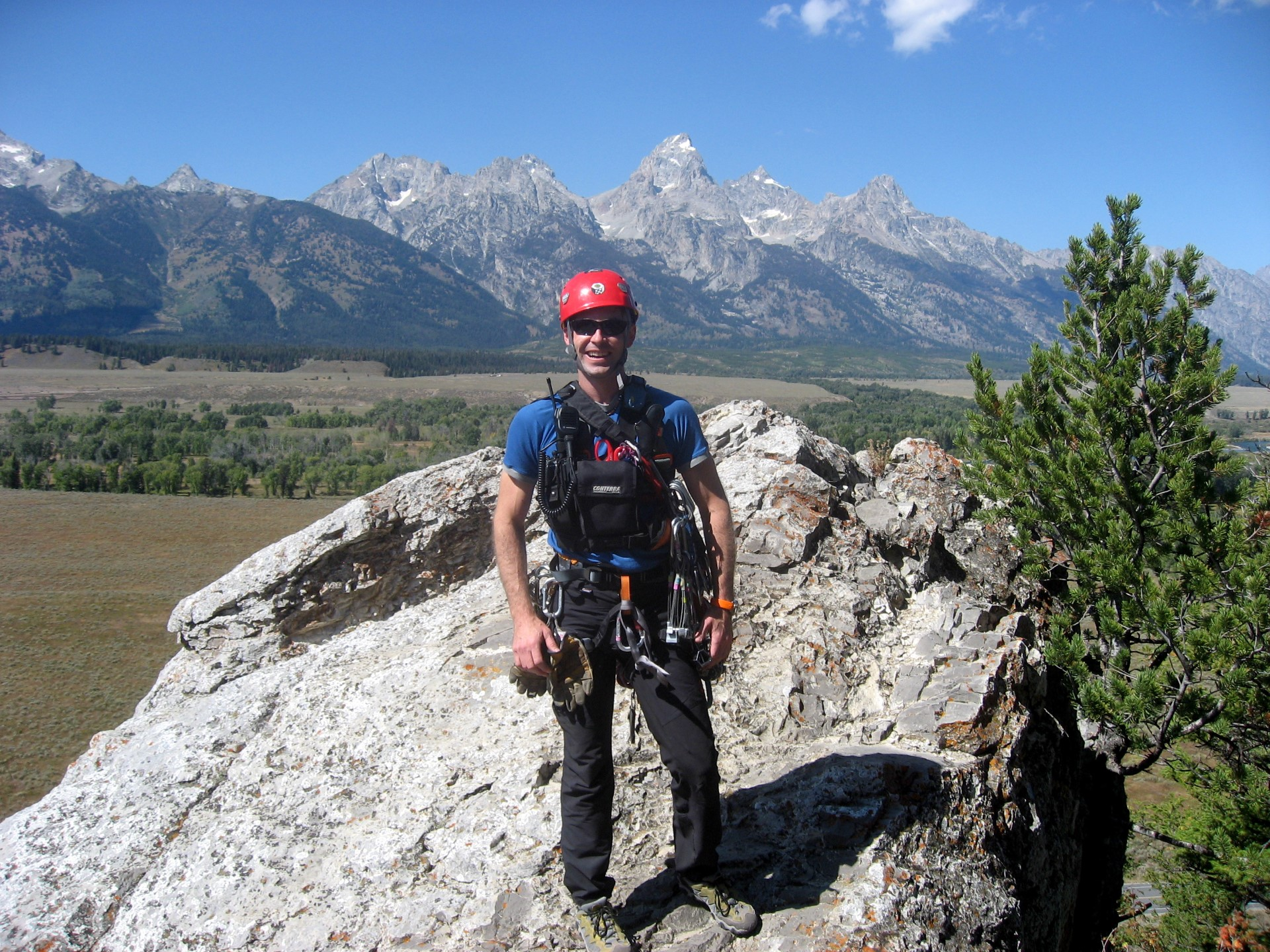
- Will Smith at Grand Teton
- Other name: Will Smith
- Education: Medical College of Wisconsin; University of Washington School of Medicine; Colorado Association of Paramedic Education; University of Wyoming
- Occupations: Physician, consultant, teacher, wilderness medicine, rescue, tactical/combat and disaster medicine
- Known for: Founder, Wilderness & Emergency Medicine Consulting
- Website: https://www.wildernessdoc.com

William 'Will' R. Smith (born 1973) is an American emergency physician and wilderness medicine consultant who lectures about integrating combat medicine into wilderness rescues around the world. He started Wilderness & Emergency Medicine Consulting, a company that helps people with pre-trip planning, online medical support, travel medicine in remote areas and provides expert witness testimony in court cases related to wilderness medicine. As medical director for the National Park Service, he oversaw the largest rescue event ever to occur in Grand Teton National Park. He lives in Jackson, Wyoming, where he is an emergency medicine physician at St. John’s Medical Center.

== Early life ==
Smith was born in rural Wyoming where grew up on a cattle ranch near Wheatland. His interest in emergency medicine began in high school where he did his basic EMT training. In college, he began to provide emergency care as a ski patroller.

== Wilderness medicine ==
As president and medical director of Wilderness & Emergency Medicine Consulting, Smith has lectured on bringing battlefield medicine into wilderness rescues, mountain medicine and wildfires.

In addition to his work as the co-medical director of Grand Teton National Park since 2005, he is medical director for Jackson Hole Fire/EMS, Teton County Search and Rescue, Bridger Teton National Forest, USDA, Jackson Hole Outdoor Leadership Institute, Rustic Pathways and Wyoming operations for Life Flight Network, Airmed International and Wilderness Medics. He Introduced a TEMS—Tactical Emergency Medical Services—program into the national parks, using protocols the military has shown to increase survival. He has trained ski patrol at Jackson Hole Mountain Resort and was hill chief and assistant patrol director at Snowy Range Ski Area in Laramie, Wyoming.

As a teacher and mentor to wilderness students, he has written dozens of peer reviewed medical research reviews for Wilderness & Environmental Medicine, Pre-Hospital Emergency Care, Society of Academic Emergency Medicine Conference, Journal of High Altitude Medicine & Biology, Journal of Military Medicine. He is the author of more than 10 chapters in wilderness medical books.

== Lightning strike rescue ==
On July 21, 2010, Smith was the medical director in a search and rescue operation to find three separate parties of 17 people who were stranded above 13,000 feet near the summit of the Grand Teton during a lightning storm. It was the largest rescue event to occur in Grand Teton National Park. Smith was the medical supervisor for 16 of the 17 people rescued. The rescue operation continued the next day to retrieve the one person who died after being struck by lightning and falling 3,000 feet. The rescue involved two helicopters, a dozen climbing rangers, two mountaineering physicians and numerous other responders. "It was a monumental test of rescuer skills and stamina, combined with incident command management ability," said Fire Rescue Magazine.

== Emergency medicine ==
Smith began studying emergency medicine in high school completing his EMT basic training. After college he completed a paramedic program in Colorado before attending medical school. He also attended the National Search and Rescue Academy and has served on the American Board of Emergency Medicine since 2005.

A clinical assistant professor at the University of Washington School of Medicine, Smith does IV, suture, intubation workshops. He teaches environmental emergencies, spinal and cardiovascular emergencies and responses to terrorism to the Jackson Hole Fire/EMS. He also teaches at the Stanford School of Medicine, Department of Emergency Medicine.

At St. John’s Medical Center in Jackson, Wyoming, he teaches the medical staff about trauma, avalanche injuries, hypothermia and other emergency medical injuries seen in the intensive care unit.

In 2008, he was appointed to American Heart Association, where he served on the First Aid Subcommittee and the American Red Cross First Aid Science Advisory Board. In 2010 and 2015 he helped develop international recommendations for first aid guidelines for the American Red Cross and the American Heart Association.

== Military service ==
In 2001 Smith joined the U.S. Army Reserve, where he rose to the rank of colonel in 2018. From 2005 to 2014, he was deployed to Iraq, Egypt, Kuwait, Croatia, Panama and El Salvador. He worked at military hospitals, led training exercises and taught courses on altitude illness, disaster medicine, lightning and search and mountain rescues to the army. After 2014, Smith became disaster medicine branch chief for the U.S. Army Medical Command in San Antonio, Texas, medical director for the Emergency Management Division and Medical Response Element and gained top secret security clearance. He is also a subject matter expert for DARPA, the Defense Advanced Research Project Agency.

== Education ==
University of Wyoming Bachelor of Science, Molecular Biology/Pre-Medicine 1991-1995; Colorado Association of Paramedic Education Paramedic Program, Denver, CO – NREMT-Paramedic 1996-1997; University of Washington School of Medicine, doctor of medicine 1997-2001; Medical College of Wisconsin, Emergency Medicine Residency 2001-2004; National Search and Rescue Academy, Instructor; American Board of Emergency Medicine, 2005; EMS Board Certified (ABEM), 2017;

== Awards ==
- 2008 Wyoming WWAMI Alumni of the Year
- 2011 Recognized as one of the top 10 National Innovators by the Journal of EMS
- 2014 Wyoming Governor’s Award for EMS Physician Medical Director of the Year
- 2015 US Army Medical Department “A” Proficiency Designator
- 2015 University of Washington School of Medicine (WWAMI Program) 10 Year Teaching Award
- 2016 John P. Pryor, MD, Street Medicine Society Award
- 2017 Excellence in Peer Review, Wilderness Medical Society
- 2017 Wilderness Medical Society Ice Axe Award
- 2021 National Park Service, Citation for Citizen’s Awards for Bravery
- 2023 Everest Award, Wilderness Medical Society

== Professional memberships ==
- ISTM – International Society of Travel Medicine
- AAEM – American Academy of Emergency Medicine (fellow)
- AWN - Academy of Wilderness Medicine (fellow)
- SOMA – Special Operations Medical Association
- DAN – Divers Alert Network
- WMS – Wilderness Medical Society (fellow)
- NAEMSP - National Association of EMS Physicians
- FAEMS - Fellow of the Academy of Emergency Medical Services (FAEMS)
- ACEP - American College Emergency Physicians (Fellow)
- Wyoming Medical Society
- NREMT - National Registry of Emergency Medical Technicians (Paramedic)

== Certifications ==
He has the following certifications:

- Licensed Physician: Wyoming, Alabama, Arizona, California, Colorado, Connecticut, District of Columbia, Delaware, Georgia, Guam, Hawaii, Idaho, Illinois, Iowa, Kentucky, Louisiana, Maine, Maryland, Michigan, Minnesota, Mississippi, Montana, Nebraska, New Hampshire, Nevada, North Dakota, Ohio, Oklahoma, Pennsylvania, South Dakota, Tennessee, Texas, Utah, Vermont, Washington, Wisconsin & West Virginia
- Board Certified: Emergency Medicine (ABEM), EMS subspecialty (ABEM-EMS)
- Provider/Instructor: ACLS, PALS, ATLS, BLS
- National Registry of EMTs – Paramedic
- Drug Enforcement Agency (DEA) License: Federal, Wyoming
- National Pro-board Certification – Firefighter 1
- Incident Qualification Card (Wildland Firefighter Red Card)
- NIMS Incident Command System Certifications: 100, 200, 300, 400, 700

== Selected publications ==
- Montopoli M, Montopoli G, Smith W, Montopoli D. Neonatal Percentile Curves: A multivariate Normal Probability Density Approach to Identifying High-Risk Neonates. Journal of the American Medical Association. Manuscript submitted 2019.
- Nichols T, Hawley A, Smith W, Wheeler A, McIntosh S. Avalanche Safety Practices Among Backcountry Skiers and Snowboarders in Jackson Hole in 2016. Wilderness & Environmental Medicine. 2018;29(4):493-8.
- Millin M, Johnson D, Schimelpfenig T, Conover K, Sholl M, Busko J, Alter R, Smith W, Symonds J, Taillac P, Hawkins S. Medical Oversight, Educational Core Content and Proposed Scopes of Practice of Wilderness EMS Providers – A Joint Project Developed by Wilderness EMS Educators, Medical Directors, and Regulators Using a Delphi Approach. Prehospital Emergency Care. 2017;21:(6)673-681.
- Smith W. Integration of Tactical EMS in the National Park Service. Wilderness & Environmental Medicine. 2017;28:S146-153.
- Petersen C, Rush S, Gallo I, Dalere B, Staak B, Moore L, Kerr, W, Chandler M, Smith W. Optimization of Simulation and Moulage in Military-Related Medical Training. Journal of Special Operation Medicine. 2017;17(3):74-80.
- Lane JP, Taylor B, Smith WR, Wheeler AR. Emergency Medical Service in the US National Park Service: A Characterization and Two Year Review, 2012-2013. Wilderness & Environmental Medicine. 2015;26:531535.
- Singletary EM, Charlton NP, Epstein JL, Ferguson JD, Jensen JL, MacPherson AI, Pellegrino JL, Smith WR, Swain JM, Lojero-Wheatley LF, Zideman DA. Part 15: first aid: 2015 American Heart Association and American Red Cross Guidelines Update for First Aid. Circulation. 2015;132(suppl 2):S574–S589.
- Ng P, Smith W, Wheeler A, McIntosh S. Advanced Safety Equipment in Backcountry Users: Current Trends and Perceptions. Wilderness & Environmental Medicine. 2015;26:417-421.
- Beasley H, Ng P, Wheeler A, Smith W, McIntosh S. The Impact of Freeze-Thaw Cycles on Epinephrine. Wilderness & Environmental Medicine. 2015:26;94-97.
- Millin M, Hawkins S, Demond A, Stiller G, McGinnis H, Baker-Rogers J, Smith W. Wilderness Emergency Medical Director Course – Development of Core Content Using a Delphi Approach. Wilderness & Environmental Medicine. 2015:26;255-260.
- Davis C, Engeln A, Johnson E, McIntosh S, Zafren K, Islas A, McStay C, Smith W, Cushing T. Wilderness Medical Society Practice Guidelines for the Prevention and Treatment of Lightning Injuries: 2014 update. Wilderness and Environmental Medicine. 2014:25;S86-95.
- Russell K, Scaife C, Weber D, Windsor J, Wheeler A, Smith W, Wedmore I, McIntosh S, Lieberman J. Wilderness Medical Society Practice Guidelines for the Treatment of Acute Pain in Remote Environments: 2014 Update. Wilderness & Environmental Medicine. 2014:25;S96-104.
- Phillips K, Longden M, Vandergraff B, Smith W, Weber D, McIntosh S, Wheeler A. Current Land Search Management Practices. Wilderness & Environmental Medicine. 2014:25(2);166-176.
- Russell K, Scaife C, Weber D, Windsor J, Wheeler A, Smith W, Wedmore I, McIntosh S, Lieberman J. Wilderness Medical Society Practice Guidelines for the Treatment of Acute Pain in Remote Environments. Wilderness & Environmental Medicine. 2014:25(1);41-9.
- Russell K, Weber D, Scheele B, Ernst R, Kanaan N, Smith W, McIntosh S, Wheeler A. Search and Rescue in the Intermountain West States. Wilderness & Environmental Medicine. 2013:24;429-433.
- Smith W, Montopoli G, Harlow H, Wheeler A, Byerly A. Mercury Toxicity in Wildland Firefighters. Wilderness & Environmental Medicine. 2013:24;141-145.
- Davis C, Engeln A, Johnson E, McIntosh S, Zafren K, Islas A, McStay C, Smith W, Cushing T. Wilderness Medical Society Practice Guidelines for the Prevention and Treatment of Lightning Injuries. Wilderness and Environmental Medicine. 2012:23(3);260-269.
- Markenson D, Ferguson JD, Chaemeides L, et al. (contributor Smith W – 3 worksheets submitted). Part 13: First Aid: 2010 American Heart Association and American Red Cross International Consensus on First Aid Science with Treatment Recommendations. Circulation. 2010 Oct 19;122(16 Suppl 2):S582-605.
- Smith W. Abstracts of Current Literature – American Journal of Sports Medicine, “The Efficacy of Wrist Protectors in Preventing Snowboarding Injuries.” Wilderness and Environmental Medicine. 2002:13;169.
- Smith W, Culley L, Plorde M, Murray J, Eisenberg M. EMS Telephone Referral Program: An Alternative Approach to Non-Urgent 911 Calls. Pre-Hospital Emergency Care. April 2001:5(2);174-180.
- Hawkins S, Millin M, Smith W. Chapter 109 - Wilderness EMS. In: EMS: Clinical Practice and Systems Oversight, 3rd Edition (Cone et al. ed.). NAEMSP/John Wiley & Sons, Inc; 2021:392-405.
- Smith W, Trentini J. Wilderness Trauma Care. In: Prehospital Trauma Life Support, 9th ed. (Pollak A, ed.) National Association of EMTs; 2020.
- Smith W. Chapter 24 – Technical Rescue Interface Introduction: Principles of Basic Technical Rescue, Patient Care Integration, and Packaging. In: Wilderness EMS, 1st ed. (Hawkins S, ed.) Wolters Kluwer Health; 2017:433-458.
- Zafren K, McCurley L, Shimanski C, Smith W, Strapazzon G. Chapter 56 – Technical Rescue. In: Wilderness Medicine, 7th ed. (Auerbach P, ed.) Elsevier; 2017:1242-1280.
- Cooper D, Smith W. Chapter 55 – Search and Rescue. In: Wilderness Medicine, 7th ed. (Auerbach P, ed.) Elsevier; 2017:1213-1242.
- Hawkins SC, Millin M, Smith W. Chapter 54 – Wilderness EMS and Response Systems. In: Wilderness Medicine, 7th ed. (Auerbach P, ed.) Elsevier; 2017:1200-1213.
- Smith W. Chapter 12– Medical Professional Roles in Search and Rescue. In: Mountain Medicine and Technical Rescue: A manual of the Diploma in Mountain Medicine (Rodway G, McIntosh S, ed.). Carreg Publishing, United Kingdom; 2016:207-223.
- Vines T, Hudson, ed. High-Angle Rope Rescue Techniques – Levels I & II, 4th ed. Smith W (Contributor and Reviewer). Jones & Bartlett Learning; 2016.
- Hawkins S, Millin M, Smith W. Chapter 42: Care in the Wilderness. In: Emergency Medical Services: Clinical Practice and System Oversight, 2nd Ed. Vol2: Medical Oversight of EMS (Cone et al. ed.) John Wiley & Sons, Ltd; 2015:377-391.
- Hudson S, Smith W, Schlim D, Knox C, Marienau K. Chapter 25. Expedition and Wilderness Medicine. In: Essential Travel Medicine (eds Zuckerman J, Brunette G, Leggat P). John Wiley & Sons, Ltd. Chichester UK; 2015:257-278.
- Zafren K, McCurley L, Shimanski C, Smith W. Chapter 38 – Technical Rescue, Self-Rescue, and Evacuation. In: Wilderness Medicine, 6th ed. (Auerbach P, ed.) Elsevier/Mosby; 2012:710-738.
- Millin M, Hawkins S, Smith W. Chapter 19 - Wilderness EMS. In: Medical Oversight of EMS (Bass et al. ed.). NAEMSP/Mosby; 2009:229-238.

== Personal life ==
Smith lives in Jackson, Wyoming with his wife Janice and two children. His hobbies include mountaineering, skiing, diving, trekking and endurance races.

A mountaineer who served in the military and has trekked all over the world, his experience applying combat medicine in the mountains led him to the specialized field of wilderness medicine.
