= Saint's triad =

Medical condition

Saint's triad is a medical condition of concurrence of the following:

1. Cholelithiasis (gallstones)
2. Hiatal hernia
3. Diverticular disease (diverticulosis of colon)

== History ==
Saint's triad is named after the British surgeon Hunterian and Emeritus Professor Charles Frederick Morris Saint CBE (14 August 1886 – 15 February 1973), who established the first school of surgery in South Africa. He emphasised the importance of considering the possibility of multiple separate diseases in a patient whenever his or her history and the results of the physical examination were atypical of any single condition. Traditionally, there is thought to be no pathophysiological basis for the coexistence of these three diseases. Saint emphasized that more than one disease may be responsible for a patient's clinical signs and symptoms, and his triad provides a counterexample to the commonly used diagnostic principle that "the explanation of any phenomenon should make as few assumptions as possible," also known as Occam's Razor. The principle underlying Saint's triad is also expressed as Hickam's dictum.

=== Recent evidence ===
A twist to this philosophic discussion on the art of diagnosis is that, in recent times, the possibility of an underlying pathophysiology has been considered—obesity is associated with gallstones, hiatal hernia, and diverticular disease, and there is the suggestion of an underlying connective tissue defect such as a "herniosis."
