= Karl Adolph von Basedow =

German physician

Carl Adolph von Basedow
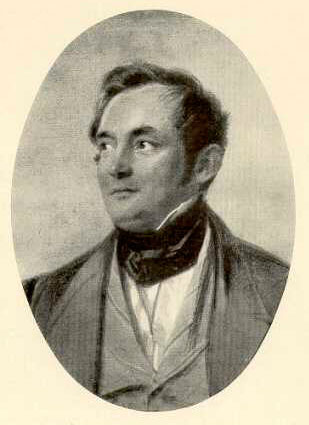
- Born: 28 March 1799
- Died: 11 April 1854 (aged 55)
- Citizenship: Anhalt-Dessau
- Education: Martin Luther University Halle-Wittenberg
- Occupation: Physician

Carl Adolph von Basedow (28 March 1799 – 11 April 1854) was a German medical doctor most famous for reporting the symptoms of what could later be dubbed Graves-Basedow disease, now technically known as exophthalmic goiter.

== Biography ==
Basedow was born in Dessau. He graduated from Halle University. He subsequently began general practice in Merseburg in 1822. He married early and became the town's chief medical officer, a position he would hold for the rest of his life. In 1840, Basedow reported on the conditions of what is now called Graves-Basedow disease. He died in Merseburg in 1854 after contracting spotted fever from a corpse he was dissecting.

== Medical work ==
Basedow has three eponymous medical conditions: Basedow's coma, a thyreotoxic coma; Basedow's ocular syndromes, the unilateral retraction of the upper lid in Basedow’s syndrome; and, Graves-Basedow disease, a disorder characterized by the "Merseburger triad": tachycardia, goitre, and exophthalmos. The term "Basedow’s disease" was suggested by Georg Hirsch in his Klinische Fragmente.

== See also ==
- Jod-Basedow phenomenon
