= Cronkhite–Canada syndrome =

- Other names: Gastrointestinal polyposis-skin pigmentation-alopecia-fingernail changes syndrome
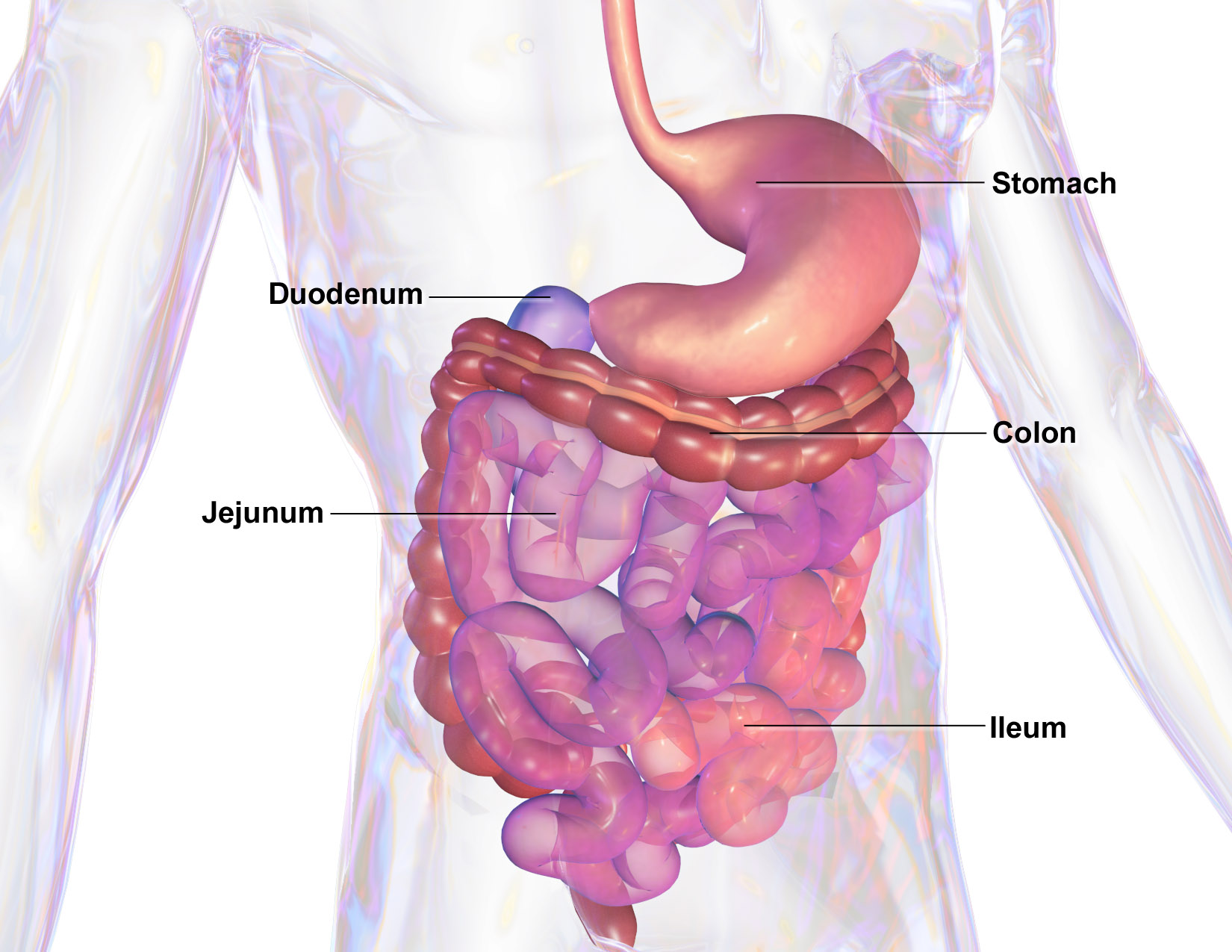
- Cronkhite–Canada syndrome affects the digestive tract
- Specialty: Gastroenterology

Cronkhite–Canada syndrome is a rare syndrome characterized by multiple polyps of the digestive tract. It is sporadic (i.e. it does not seem to be a hereditary disease), and it is currently considered acquired and idiopathic (i.e. its cause remains unknown).

About two-thirds of patients are of Japanese descent and the male to female ratio is 3:2. It was characterized in 1955 by internal medicine physician Leonard Wolsey Cronkhite Jr. and radiologist Wilma Jeanne Canada.

== Signs and symptoms ==
Polyps are found throughout the GI tract (most frequently in the stomach and large intestine, followed by the small intestine) though typically avoid the esophagus. A biopsy will reveal them to be hamartomas; the possibility that they progress to cancer is generally considered to be low, although it has been reported multiple times in the past. Chronic diarrhea and protein-losing enteropathy are often observed. Possible collateral features include variable anomalies of ectodermal tissues, such as alopecia, atrophy of the nails, or skin pigmentation.

== Diagnosis ==
There is no specific test to diagnose Cronkhite–Canada syndrome. Diagnosis is based on symptoms and features of the disease.

== Management ==
Nutritional support is fundamental, and may include dietary guidance, supplements, tube feeding, or intravenous solutions. Treatments proposed include cromolyn sodium and prednisone, as well as histamine (H2) receptor antagonists or proton pump inhibitors.
