= Lisa Welander =

Swedish neurologist

- Born: 9 August 1909; Södermanland, Sweden
- Died: 9 December 2001 (aged 92)
- Education: Karolinska institutet; Serafimerlasarettet
- Known for: Welander's distal myopathy; Kugelberg-Welander disease
- Scientific career
- Fields: Neurology
- Thesis: Myopathia distalis tarda hereditaria: 249 examined cases in 72 pedigrees (1951)

Lisa Welander (9 August 1909 - 9 December 2001) was a Swedish neurologist, and was Sweden's first professor of neurology, taking up her professorship at Umeå University from 1964 to 1975.

== Career ==
Welander graduated from Örebro University in 1928, and became a medical licentiate in Stockholm in 1937. She received her doctorate of medicine in 1952 from the Karolinska Institute and then became an associate professor of neurology there, and in 1953 at the Medical College of the University of Gothenburg. Welander became a professor of neurology at Umeå University from 1964 to 1975.

In 1951 Welander was the first to describe the hereditary muscular disease Welander's distal myopathy, a type of distal muscular dystrophy. Welander is also known for her work with Eric Kugelberg on spinal muscular atrophy (SMA). The juvenile manifestation of the disease SMA type III is named after her and her colleague Kugelberg-Welander disease.

== Publications ==
- Welander, L. (1951). "Myopathia distalis tarda hereditaria; 249 examined cases in 72 pedigrees." Acta Medica Scandinavica. Supplementum. 265:1-124.
- Kugelberg, E., Welander, L. (1956). "Heredofamilial juvenile muscular atrophy simulating muscular dystrophy". Archives of Neurology and Psychiatry. 75(5): 500-509. doi:10.1001/archneurpsyc.1956.02330230050005
- Welander, L. (1957). "Homozygous Appearance of Distal Myopathy". Acta Genetica et Statistica Medica. 7(2): 321-325. doi:10.1159/000150998
- Welander, L. (1961). Genetic research in muscular diseases in Sweden. In Proceeding df the Second International Congress of Human, Genetics. Roma. 3:1629-1636.
