= Adnan Abdallat =

Jordanian neurologist (1943–2021)

- Born: 1943; Al-Salt, Jordan
- Died: 9 March 2021
- Medical career
- Sub-specialties: Neurologist
- Notable works: Abdallat–Davis–Farrage syndrome

Adnan Al Abdallat (1943 – 9 March 2021) was a Jordanian neurologist. He participated in the discovery of Abdallat Davis Farrage syndrome in 1980.

Dr. Adnan Al Abdallat served in King Hussein Medical Center, a military hospital in Amman, Jordan. Abdallat held the position of head of the Neurologist Department in the hospital until he retired and opened his private research and clinic center.

== Death ==
Abdallat died on 9 March 2021, of an infection and complication with COVID-19.
