= Georg Gruber =

Austrian-born musicologist, composer and educator

- Born: 27 July 1904; Vienna, Austria
- Died: 5 September 1979 (aged 75); Fort Beaufort, South Africa
- Occupations: Musicologist, composer, educator
- Known for: Contributions to music education in South Africa, choral compositions

Georg Gruber (27 July 1904 – 5 September 1979) was an Austrian-born musicologist, composer, and educator. He played a significant role in developing music education in South Africa, particularly at Rhodes University and the University of Fort Hare, and was known for his contributions to choral music and university curricula.

== Early life and education ==
Gruber was born in Vienna, Austria, and initially pursued studies in commerce and law at the University of Vienna before shifting his focus to music in 1924. He studied at the Vienna Staatsakademie für Musik und Darstellende Kunst, specializing in composition, organ, pianoforte, Gregorian chant, conducting, church music, and singing. He earned a doctorate in musicology in 1928 with a dissertation on 16th-century German songs in the Innsbruck court chapel.

== Career ==
=== Vienna and international touring ===
Gruber began his career as the director of a music school for adults under the Austrian Department of Adult Education and later became the conductor-in-chief of the Vienna Boys' Choir. Between 1930 and 1937, he led the choir on extensive tours across Europe, North America, and South America. He later founded his own ensemble, the Vienna Mozart Boys' Choir, with which he toured Australia, New Zealand, and the Pacific Islands.

=== Internment in Australia and allegations of Nazi affiliation ===
In 1939, while on tour in Australia, Gruber and his choir became stranded due to the outbreak of World War II. Initially, he continued his musical activities in Melbourne and Sydney, but in 1941, he was arrested by Australian authorities on suspicion of Nazi affiliations and was interned at the Tatura Internment Camp until his deportation to Austria in 1947.

The extent of Gruber’s involvement with the Nazi Party remains debated. Historian Richard Geehr has argued that Gruber was an early member of the Austrian Nazi Party and suggested that his success with multiple choirs during the Anschluss era would have been impossible without the support of the National Socialist regime. Journalist Alan Gill has noted that the evidence related to Gruber’s arrest included a document proposing the establishment of an academy under his direction to teach military music, choral singing, folk dancing, and Nazi ceremonial practices. Gruber himself admitted to some level of involvement in Nazi musical education but insisted that his role had been exaggerated, claiming that he was merely selecting songs for children to sing.

His arrest was also influenced by personal factors. According to Gill, Gruber had an affair with Henrietta Marsh, a key sponsor of the choir in Australia. Marsh reportedly informed authorities of his supposed Nazi ties in retaliation for his shifting romantic interest to her daughter.

After his deportation, Gruber underwent denazification in Austria before resuming his career in music and academia.

=== Academic career in South Africa ===
In 1953, Gruber moved to South Africa to lecture at Rhodes University. In 1955, he was appointed Professor and Head of the Department of Music and Musicology. During his tenure, he significantly expanded the department’s curriculum, introduced new degree programs, and founded the Rhodes University Chamber Choir, which gained international recognition through multiple European tours.

After retiring from Rhodes University in 1972, he was invited to establish the first university music program at the Historically Black University, University of Fort Hare. He developed a syllabus tailored to students with little prior exposure to formal music education and introduced a Bachelor of Pedagogics in Music in 1974.

To address the student's lack of prior formal music education, Gruber wrote a manual in 1974, From Tonic Solfa to Staff Notation, specifically to address the Fort Hare students’ unfamiliarity with staff notation. Music scholar Jeffrey Brukman has argued that Gruber’s progressive efforts to provide Black students with the knowledge of staff notation, which would have granted them access to “greater musical and professional opportunities”, was “laudable for its time”, especially considering that apartheid’s separate development and Bantu education policies did not typically “favour promoting strong educational possibilities – especially Western-styled education – for Black South Africans”. However, the book’s radical potential is diminished by Gruber’s paternalistic tone and his belief in the “superiority of Western music and culture”, which manifest in statements mentioning the need for African musicians to understand staff notation in order to “contribute to the music of the world” and develop their own music.

== Contributions to music education ==
Gruber’s philosophy of music education emphasized accessibility, advocating that music should be taught to all children rather than only the talented few. His approach was influenced by Carl Orff and Zoltán Kodály. He also played a key role in debates about South African music education during the 1960s and 1970s.

== Compositions ==
Gruber composed extensively, particularly in the choral genre. His works include:

- Missa in Honorem Sanctorum Innocentium Tribus Paribus Vocibus (1940)
- Missa Brevis in Honorem Sanctae Sophiae Matris (1948)
- Terra Nova (1963)
- Ukucula Ematola (1965)
- Izango ZakwaNtu (1968), which blended African musical structures with Western classical techniques.

== Legacy ==
Gruber’s contributions to South African music education, particularly in higher education and choral traditions, left a lasting impact. His integration of African and Western music remains influential in South African music curricula. He died in 1979 in Fort Beaufort, Cape Province.
