= Bernheim syndrome =

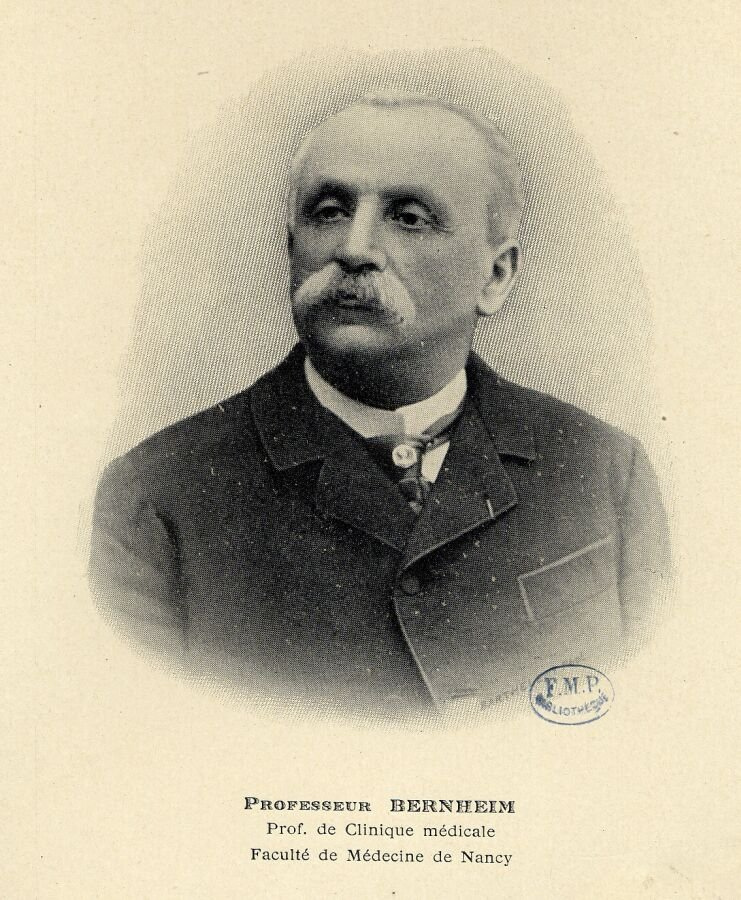
Hippolyte Bernheim (1840-1919)

Bernheim syndrome is a presumed disorder wherein the right ventricle is severely compressed due to a shift in the ventricular septal wall of the heart, leading to heart failure. It was first described by Hippolyte Bernheim in 1910. Today, it is argued whether or not Bernheim syndrome is indeed a syndrome or a side effect of other cardiac conditions, such as left ventrical heart failure where the left ventricle is substantially enlarged, encroaching on the space of the right ventricle.

== Signs and symptoms ==
Signs and symptoms of Bernheim syndrome are ill-defined and typically follow those of heart failure. Bernheim distinguished Bernheim syndrome from the typical heart failure manifestations via the engorgement of veins due to congestion without evidence of pulmonary congestion. There is also evidence of venous blockage going into pulmonary circulation and is therefore isolated to the right side of the heart. Manifestations of Bernheim syndrome include symptoms of hypertension, ronchi in the lungs, edema, vein distention, and signs of poor perfusion. There are no manifestations of dyspnea nor pulmonary congestion until it is presumed to be a terminal stage of Bernheim syndrome.

== Etiology ==
Bernheim syndrome is believed to be the rightward shift of the ventricular septum compressing the right ventricle without causing pulmonary congestion. This was first described by Hippolyte Bernheim in which he presented 10 patients with signs and symptoms of right sided heart failure whose postmortem autospy reveals a ventricular septum that invaded the right ventricle space. This opposed the traditional view of right sided heart failure, right ventricular hypertrophy, where the right ventricle is enlarged. Bernheim describes right ventricles the size of a slit, which was due to the bulging ventricular septum wall.

Bernheim syndrome is believed to occur in two stages: the anatomical and clinical stages. During the anatomical stage, there are no clinical signs of the syndrome, but the stenosis of the right ventricle makes it difficult to fill to its normal capacity. This is a offset by the dilation of the right atrium as it takes in different volume. In the clinical period, there are signs and symptoms present. In the clinical period, there are two stages. In the first stage of the clinical signs of venous obstruction due to the right ventricular stenosis become apparent while pulmonary blood flow continues normally. In the second stage of the symptoms of poor circulation becomes apparent such as systemic venous engorgement. It is at this point where the patient appears to have heart failure.

A normal view of right ventricle flow via cardiac MRI. In Bernheim syndrome, the movement in the right ventricle is severely impaired.

== Diagnosis ==
Most cases of Bernheim syndrome have been identified postmortem in necropsy. A cross-sectional view of the heart muscle will show a greatly reduced right ventricle size. In necropsy, it is typical for the heart and lungs to be weighed with a higher weight indicating a build up of blood in the lungs: pulmonary congestion. The weight of the lungs is therefore expected to be within normal limits to rule out pulmonary congestion (900-1,280g). The weight of the liver was also part of diagnosis with a significantly greater weight than what is in normal limits (1,440-1,680g) indicative of vein distention.

In a clinical setting, Bernheim claims that the presence of isolated right ventricular failure clearly came from the presence of left ventricular hypertrophy which came secondary resulting to the presence of Bernheims symptom. This is especially considered when the heart failure is not due to a weakness in the myocardium but in the stenosis of the myocardial wall. Fluoroscopy is used to view the blood flow in the heart has also been deemed as a reliable tool. It would be expected for the left ventricle and right atrium to be enlarged with the other two chambers appearing "normal". However, it was typical example to only confirm the presence of Bernheim syndrome in the setting of autopsy.

== History ==
In the medical community, however, it is believed that Bernheim syndrome does not actually exist and is only an observed side effect of another condition such as left ventricular hypertrophy. This is due to the lack of finding regarding sole right ventricle compression, without accompaniment of left ventricular hypertrophy, which is expected to encroach into the right ventricular space. It is claimed that there is no observation of a rightward shift of the ventricular septum as is described by Bernheim. Furthermore, using evidence from right and left peak systolic pressures, they determined there was no evidence of right ventricular stenosis to begin with. When right ventricular heart failure is found without left ventricular heart failure, it was accompanied by pulmonary embolism and/or mitral valve stenosis. It is because of these findings that there has been a movement to remove Bernheim syndrome from medical terminology.
