= Karl-Axel Ekbom =

Swedish neurologist (1907–1977)

Karl-Axel Ekbom (23 September 1907 in Gothenburg – 15 March 1977 in Uppsala) was a Swedish neurologist. He is mostly known for his detailed description of restless legs syndrome (RLS).

Ekbom started his medical studies in Stockholm in 1928 and was licensed in 1934. He received the Doctor of Medicine degree in 1945. After working at the Karolinska Institute from 1945 to 1958, he became Professor of Neurology at the University of Uppsala where he worked until 1974.

Ekbom's doctoral thesis "Restless Legs Syndrome: A Clinical Study of a Hitherto Overlooked Disease in the Legs Characterized by Peculiar paresthesia ("anxietas Tibiarum"), Pain and Weakness and Occurring In Two Main Forms, asthenia Crurum Paraesthetica and asthenia Crurum Dolorosa" was published in 1944 or 1945. He introduced the term of the disease and described how to diagnosis it. For this he received the Swedish Lennmalms Prize in 1949. The first case report of RLS was published by Thomas Willis in 1685. RLS has been referred to also as Willis-Ekbom syndrome and Wittmaack-Ekbom syndrome.

Ekbom described the syndrome of delusional parasitosis. The condition has been termed Ekbom syndrome.
