= Abdallat–Davis–Farrage syndrome =

Medical condition

Abdallat Davis Farrage syndrome
- Abdallat–Davis–Farrage syndrome has an autosomal recessive pattern of inheritance.
- Specialty: Neurology
- Symptoms: Albinism, irregular decreased skin pigmentation, excessive freckling, insensitivity to pain, peripheral neuropathy, and paraparesis/quadraparesis.
- Named after: Adnan Abdallat

Abdallat–Davis–Farrage syndrome is a form of phakomatosis, a disease of the central nervous system accompanied by skin abnormalities. It is characterized by abnormal skin pigmentation.

The condition is named after the team of medical professionals who first wrote it up, describing the appearance of the syndrome in a family from Jordan. It was characterized in 1980 by Adnan Abdallat, a Jordanian doctor.

== Signs and symptoms ==
Clinical presentation is as follows:

- Albinism (hair)
- Irregular decreased skin pigmentation
- Excessive freckling
- Insensitivity to pain
- Paraparesis/quadraparesis

== Genetics ==
The syndrome is thought to be inherited as an autosomal recessive genetic trait, meaning that in order to manifest symptoms, a person must inherit a gene for Abdallat–Davis–Farrage syndrome from both parents. As it is also autosomal (not linked to either of the genes that determine gender), it can manifest in both men and women. Those with only one gene are carriers, and they typically manifest no symptoms; in the event that a person inherits both genes, symptoms usually appear before one year of age.
