= José María Cantú Garza =

Mexican (1938–2007) geneticist

- Born: 13 December 1938; Monterrey, Nuevo León
- Died: 12 November 2007 (aged 68); Buenos Aires, Argentina
- Education: National Autonomous University of Mexico and University of Paris I
- Occupation: Geneticist
- Scientific career
- Workplaces: Mexican Institute of Social Security (IMSS)

José María Cantú Garza (13 December 1938 – 12 November 2007) was a Mexican genetics researcher.

Cantú was born in Monterrey, Nuevo León in 1938 and moved to Reynosa, Tamaulipas. He graduated with a bachelor's degree in Medicine from the National Autonomous University of Mexico (UNAM, 1965) and received a doctorate degree in Human Genetics from the University of Paris I.

He worked as a professor in the University of Guadalajara and served as head of the Genetics Division of the Mexican Institute of Social Security (IMSS). He published about 400 papers and 80 book chapters.

== Recognition ==
He was member of the Mexican Academy of Sciences, the Ethics Committee of Human Genome Project and collaborated with the Health Ministry of Argentina.

In his last years he resided in South America, where he was member of the National Science Foundation of Uruguay (CONACYT). He was president of several Mexican and Latin American associations and International Federation of Human Genetics Society (IFHGS).

Cantú Garza was awarded Doctor Honoris Causa by Universidad Ricardo Palma de Lima. In 2007 he was named Emeritus Research by Mexico's National Science Foundation, CONACYT.

A hospital in Reynosa, Tamaulipas is also named after him.
