= François-Amilcar Aran =

French physician

François-Amilcar Aran (12 July 1817, in Bordeaux – 22 February 1861, in Paris) was a French medical doctor.

He studied medicine in Bordeaux and received his doctorate in Paris with a thesis on heart palpitations. In Paris he subsequently became a hospital physician and a professor agrégé. He worked as a deputy physician to Léon Louis Rostan at the Hôtel-Dieu, where he held popular clinical lectures. He also distinguished himself in his work performed at the Hôpital Saint-Antoine.

With Duchenne de Boulogne, the eponymous "Aran-Duchenne spinal muscular atrophy" is named. Aran first described the disease in an article titled Recherches sur une maladie non encore décrit du systéme musculaire (atrophie musculaire progressive) (1850).

He was known for his translation of foreign works, he translated James Henry Bennett’s Practical Treatise on Inflammation of the Uterus and Its Appendages and on the Connexion with other Uterine Diseases as Traité pratique de l'inflammation de l'utérus, and Joseph Skoda’s Abhandlung über Perkussion und Auskultation as Traité de percussion et d’auscultation (1854). Aran's Manuel pratique des maladies du coeur et des gros vaisseaux (1842) was later translated into English and published as Practical manual of the diseases of the heart and great vessels (1843).
