= Cock's peculiar tumour =

- Specialty: Oncology

Cock's peculiar tumour is a sebaceous cyst linked growth that can resemble a squamous cell carcinoma. The name is given after a 19th-century English surgeon Edward Cock. The proliferating cyst is usually solitary, but it often arises from a simple trichilemmal cysts in the hair follicle epithelium and these are multiple in 70% of cases. They are most commonly found on the scalp where the proliferating trichilemmal cyst will grow to a large size and ulcerate. Chronic inflammation can cause the cyst to take the form of a granuloma. This granuloma mimics a squamous-cell carcinoma (both clinically and histologically) and these ulcerating solitary cysts are called Cock's peculiar tumour.

The most common sites for this tumour to develop are where one can find hairs. These are, but are not limited to, the scalp, underarms and pubic areas, including the scrotum and vulva.
