= Plyushkin =

Fictional character in Nikolai Gogol's novel Dead Souls

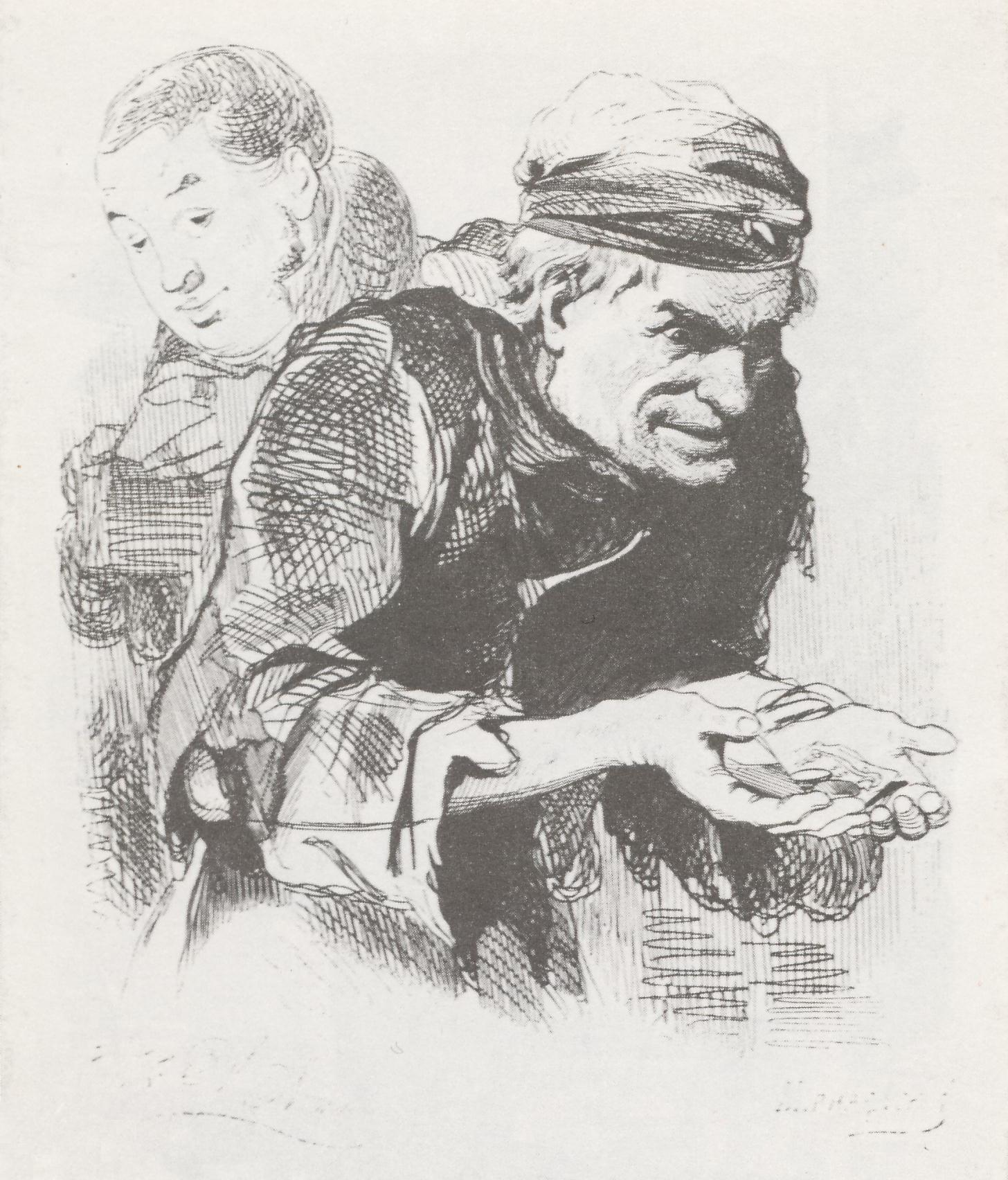
Plyushkin, drawing by Alexander Agin (1846-1847)

Stepan Plyushkin (Russian: Степан Плюшкин) is a fictional character in Nikolai Gogol's novel Dead Souls. He is a landowner who obsessively collects and saves everything he finds, to the point that when he wants to celebrate a deal with the protagonist Chichikov, he orders one of his serfs to find a cake that a visitor brought several years ago, scrape off the mold, and bring it to them. At the same time, his estate is incredibly inefficient; the cut wheat rots on the ground and any potential income is lost.

His surname is derived from the Russian word for flat bun pastry (plyushka).

== Background ==
Plyushkin had two daughters and a son, but upon the death of his wife he became a suspicious miser. The younger daughter died and the other two siblings left home. When his daughter Aleksandra Stepanovna visited him several times with gifts and grandchildren, but received no money in return, she stopped visiting. When Chichikov meets Plyushkin, he mistakes him for the steward due to his ignoble dress.

== Plyushkin syndrome ==
Today in Russia, the name "Plyushkin" is semi-humorously applied to people who collect and amass various useless things, a behavior known as compulsive hoarding. Sometimes the terms "Plyushkin symptom" or "Plyushkin syndrome" are used to describe such people, and "Plyushkin" is used as a colloquial metonymic reference to hoarders.
