= Guido Fanconi =

Swiss pediatrician (1892–1979)

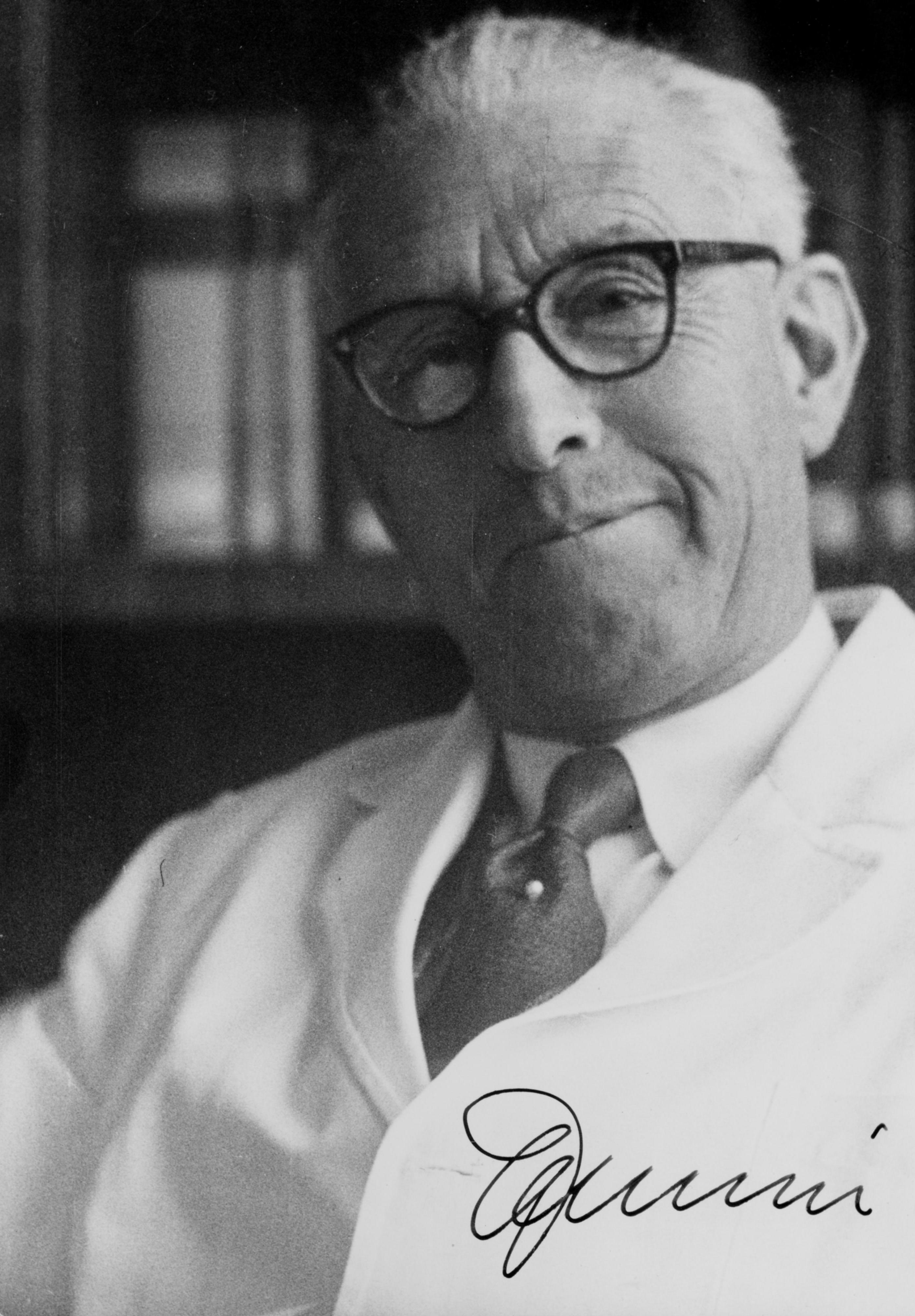
Guido Fanconi, c. 1959. Photo: Ze'ev Aleksandrowicz

Guido Fanconi (English: /fɑːnˈkoʊni/) (1 January 1892 – 10 October 1979) was a Swiss pediatrician.

== Biography ==
Fanconi was born on 1 January 1892 in Poschiavo, a small village in the Canton of Grisons. Fanconi is regarded as one of the founders of modern pediatrics.

He received his secondary school education in Zürich. In 1911, he began his medical training in Lausanne. In 1920, he entered the Kinderspital (Children's Hospital) of the University of Zurich, where, with the exception of one year, he remained for 45 years.

Fanconi recognized the importance of biochemistry to clinical medicine. In 1929 he succeeded Emil Feer as professor of pediatrics and head of the Kinderspital. Under his direction, it became one of the most renowned children's hospitals in the world.

There are several medical conditions named after Dr. Fanconi. In 1927 he described hereditary panmyelopathy with short stature and hyperpigmentation, better known as Fanconi anemia. In 1934 the first cases of cystic fibrosis of the pancreas were described in a thesis written under his direction. In 1941 a large epidemic of poliomyelitis occurred in Switzerland. Fanconi analyzed its epidemiology and found that the virus was not transmitted by droplet infection, as previously assumed, but rather follows a gastrointestinal pathway like typhoid fever. His understanding of pathophysiologic connections culminated in his prediction that Down syndrome was due to a chromosomal abnormality, 20 years before trisomy 21 was discovered. His contributions to renal physiology led to renal Fanconi syndrome being named for him.

In 1945 he founded a new pediatric journal, Helvetica Paediatrica Acta, which has become an internationally renowned periodical. Dr. Fanconi retired in 1965 from his chairmanship in pediatrics, but continued to practice and lecture until his death.

== See also ==
- Prader–Willi syndrome, discovered by a team of physicians including Fanconi
- Fanconi–Bickel syndrome
