= Brill–Zinsser disease =

- Specialty: Infectious diseases

Brill–Zinsser disease is a delayed relapse of epidemic typhus, caused by Rickettsia prowazekii. After a patient contracts epidemic typhus from the fecal matter of an infected louse (Pediculus humanus), the rickettsia can remain latent and reactivate months or years later, with symptoms similar to or even identical to the original attack of typhus, including a maculopapular rash.

== Cause ==
Brill–Zinsser disease is a relapsing form of louse-borne typhus caused by Rickettsia prowazekii. Humans are considered the primary reservoir for R. prowazekii. The infection is transmitted from human to louse to human through the body louse. Transmission occurs when skin contaminated with infective louse feces is rubbed or scratched. The body louse lives in clothing and requires daily blood meals and body warmth to survive. Infestation occurs when blankets and clothing are not changed or washed regularly. Brill–Zinsser disease may occur years to decades after the primary infection.

== Symptoms ==
Symptoms of Brill–Zinsser disease are usually milder than those of the initial typhus infection and rarely lead to complications. They are similar to those of the primary infection, with a rapid onset of chills, fever, headache, and malaise. The fever reaches its peak within two or three days, with temperature remissions of less than 1°C without antipyretics. The rash is maculopapular, peripherally indistinct, irregular, and non-blanching on pressure, with some areas of confluence. It begins on day 3 or 4. Apathy occurs early, and constipation may also occur. The headache is intense and persists throughout the disease.

== Serology and treatment ==
Patients with Brill–Zinsser disease do not have specific IgM antibodies but have elevated levels of IgG antibodies against R. prowazekii. Treatment is the same as for primary epidemic typhus. Most patients recover when treated early with chloramphenicol or a tetracycline drug.

== See also ==
- Nathan Edwin Brill
- Hans Zinsser
- Tick-borne lymphadenopathy
