= Edward Cock =

19th-century British surgeon

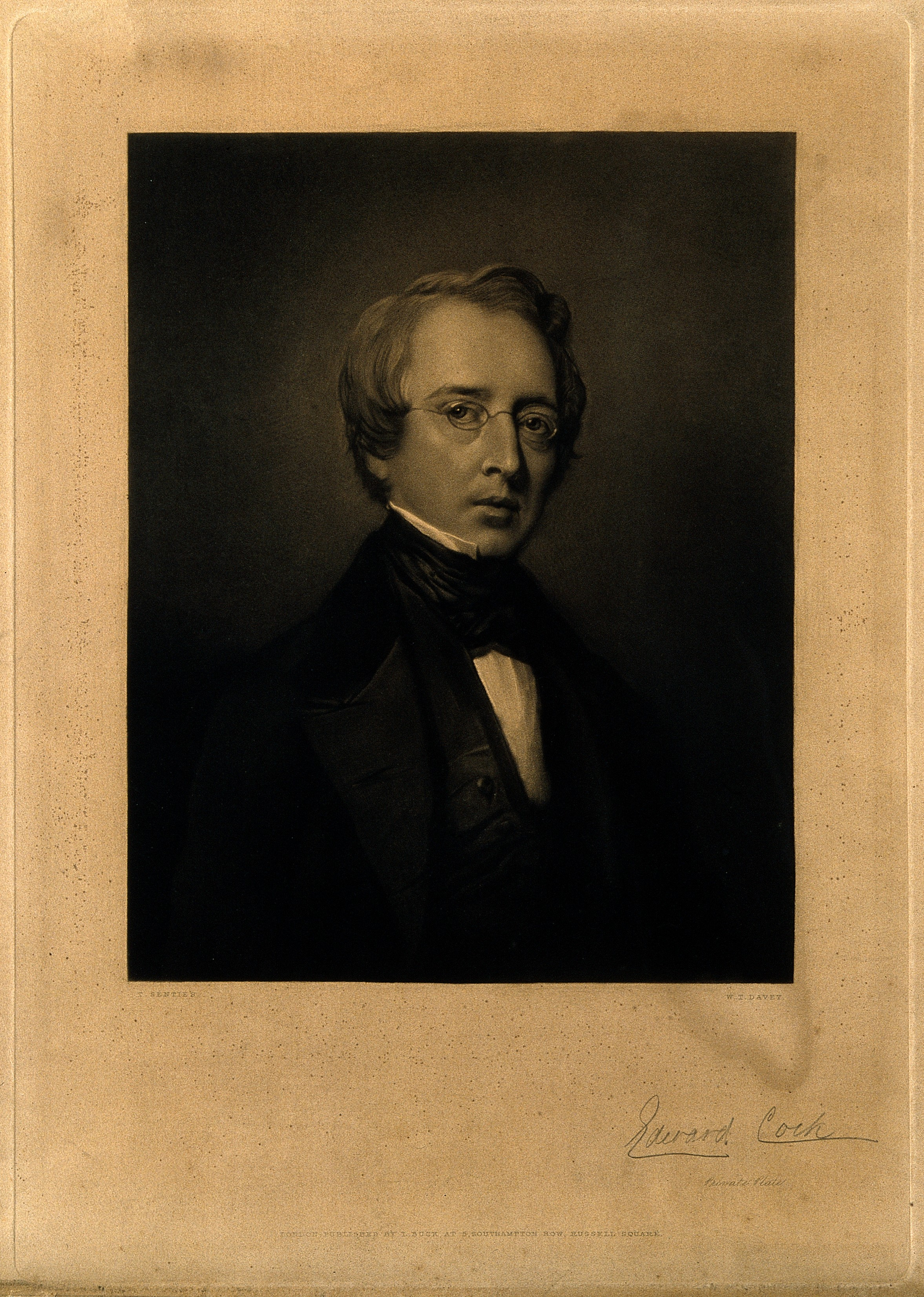
Early portrait of Edward Cock

Edward Cock (1805–1892) was a British surgeon. He published multiple academic papers, including a description of a novel approach to urethra surgery. He served as President of the Royal College of Surgeons.

== Early life ==
Cock was a nephew of Sir Astley Cooper, and through him became at an early age a member of the staff of the Borough Hospital in London, where he worked in the dissecting room for 13 years.

== Career ==
Afterwards, he became in 1838 assistant surgeon at Guy's Hospital, where from 1849 to 1871 he was surgeon, and from 1871 to 1892 consulting surgeon. He rose to be president of the Royal College of Surgeons in 1869. He was an excellent anatomist, a bold operator, and a clear and incisive writer. Though he spoke with a stutter in lecturing, he frequently used it with humorous effect and emphasis.

From 1843 to 1849, Cock was editor of Guy's Hospital Reports, which contain many of his papers, particularly on urethral stenosis, puncture of the bladder, injuries to the head, and hernia. He was the first English surgeon to perform pharyngotomy with success, and also one of the first to succeed in trephining for middle meningeal haemorrhage. Still, the operation by which his name is known is that of opening the urethra through the perineum, described in 1866.

== Death ==
He died at Kingston in 1892.
