= Leo von Zumbusch =

Austrian-German dermatologist (1874–1940)

Leo von Zumbusch (28 June 1874, in Vienna – 30 March 1940, in Rimsting) was an Austrian-German dermatologist. He was the son of sculptor Kaspar von Zumbusch (1830–1915). He studied medicine in Vienna, where he later worked as an assistant to dermatologists Moritz Kaposi and Gustav Riehl. In 1906, he obtained his habilitation for dermatology and syphilology, and in 1912 became an associate professor.

In 1909, he was named head of the Rudolfspital in Vienna, and four years later relocated to the Ludwig-Maximilians-Universität München. In 1915, he was appointed director of the department of syphilis and dermatology. From 1932 to 1933, he served as university rector. In 1935, he was forced by the Nazi government to relinquish his position at the university for political reasons.

In 1910, he described a rare form of generalized pustular psoriasis that is now referred to as Zumbusch psoriasis.

== Selected works ==
- Therapie der Hautkrankheiten : für Ärzte und Studierende, 1908 – Therapy of skin diseases for physicians and students.
- Atlas der Syphilis, translated into English in 1922 as "Atlas of syphilis".
- Atlas der Hautkrankheiten (with Gustav Riehl), translated into English in 1925 as "Atlas of diseases of the skin".
