= Ranke =

Ranke is a German surname. Persons with the surname include:

- Clarissa von Ranke (1808-1871), Irish poet
- Friedrich Heinrich Ranke (1798–1876), German theologian
- Heinrich von Ranke (1830–1909), German physiologist and physician
- Hermann Ranke (1878–1953), German Egyptologist
- Johannes Ranke (1836–1916), German physiologist and anthropologist
- Karl Ernst Ranke (1870–1926), German pathologist
- Karl Ferdinand Ranke (1802–1876), German educator
- Leopold von Ranke (1795–1886), German historian
- Otto Friedrich Ranke (1899–1959), German physiologist
