= Villach =

- Statutory city
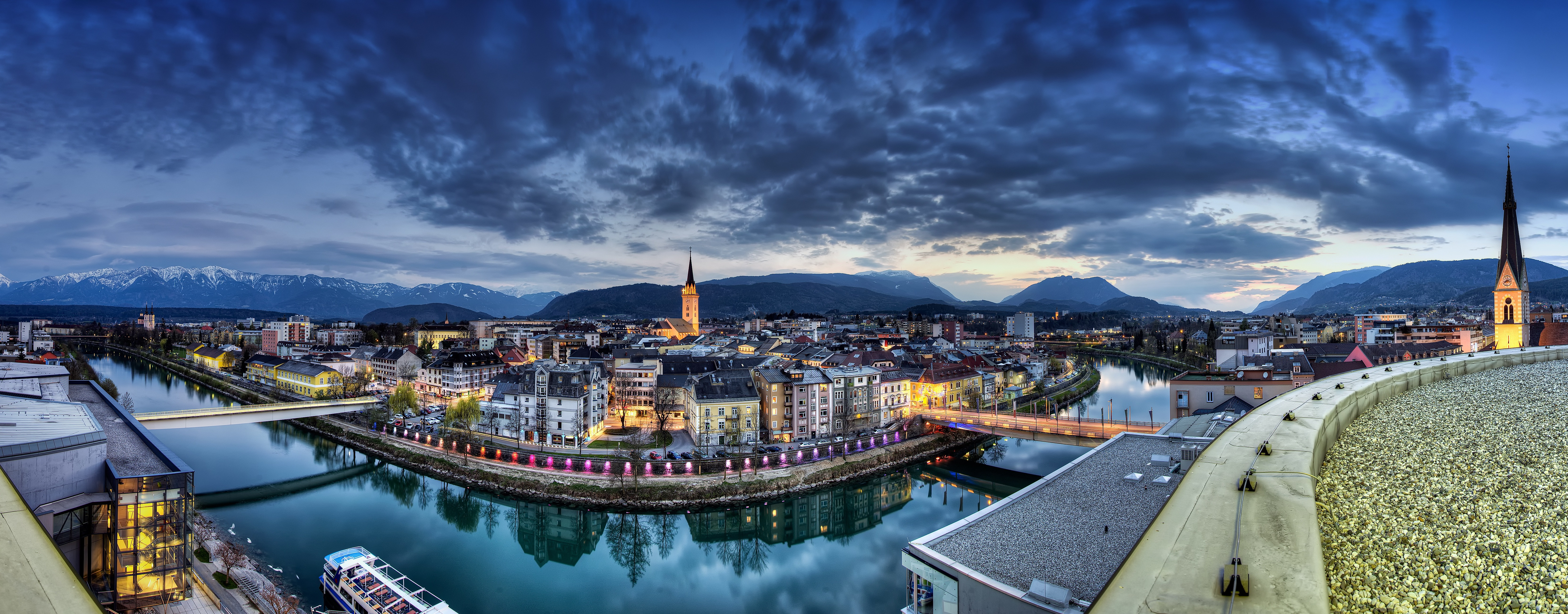
- Drava riverside

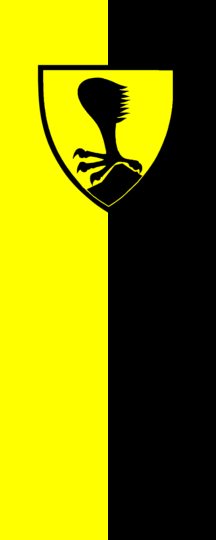
- Flag Coat of arms

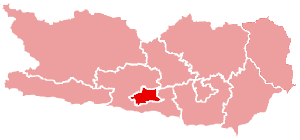
- Location of Villach within Carinthia

- Location within Austria Villach (Austria)
- Coordinates: 46°37′N 13°51′E
- Country: Austria
- State: Carinthia
- District: Statutory city

Government
  - Mayor: Günther Albel (SPÖ)

Area
  - Total: 134.98 km^{2} (52.12 sq mi)
- Elevation: 501 m (1,644 ft)

Population (2025)
  - Total: 65,749
  - Density: 487.10/km^{2} (1,261.6/sq mi)
- Time zone: UTC+1 (CET)
  - Summer (DST): UTC+2 (CEST)
- Postal code: 9500
- Area code: 04242
- Vehicle registration: VI
- Website: villach.at

Villach (German pronunciation: [ˈfɪlax]; Slovene: Beljak; Italian: Villaco; Friulian: Vilac) is the seventh-largest city in Austria and the second-largest in the state of Carinthia. It is an important traffic junction for southern Austria and the whole Alpe-Adria region. As of 2025, Villach had a population of 65,749.

Together with other Alpine towns Villach engages in the Alpine Town of the Year Association for the implementation of the Alpine Convention to achieve sustainable development in the Alpine Arc. In 1997, Villach was the first town to be awarded Alpine Town of the Year.

== Geography ==
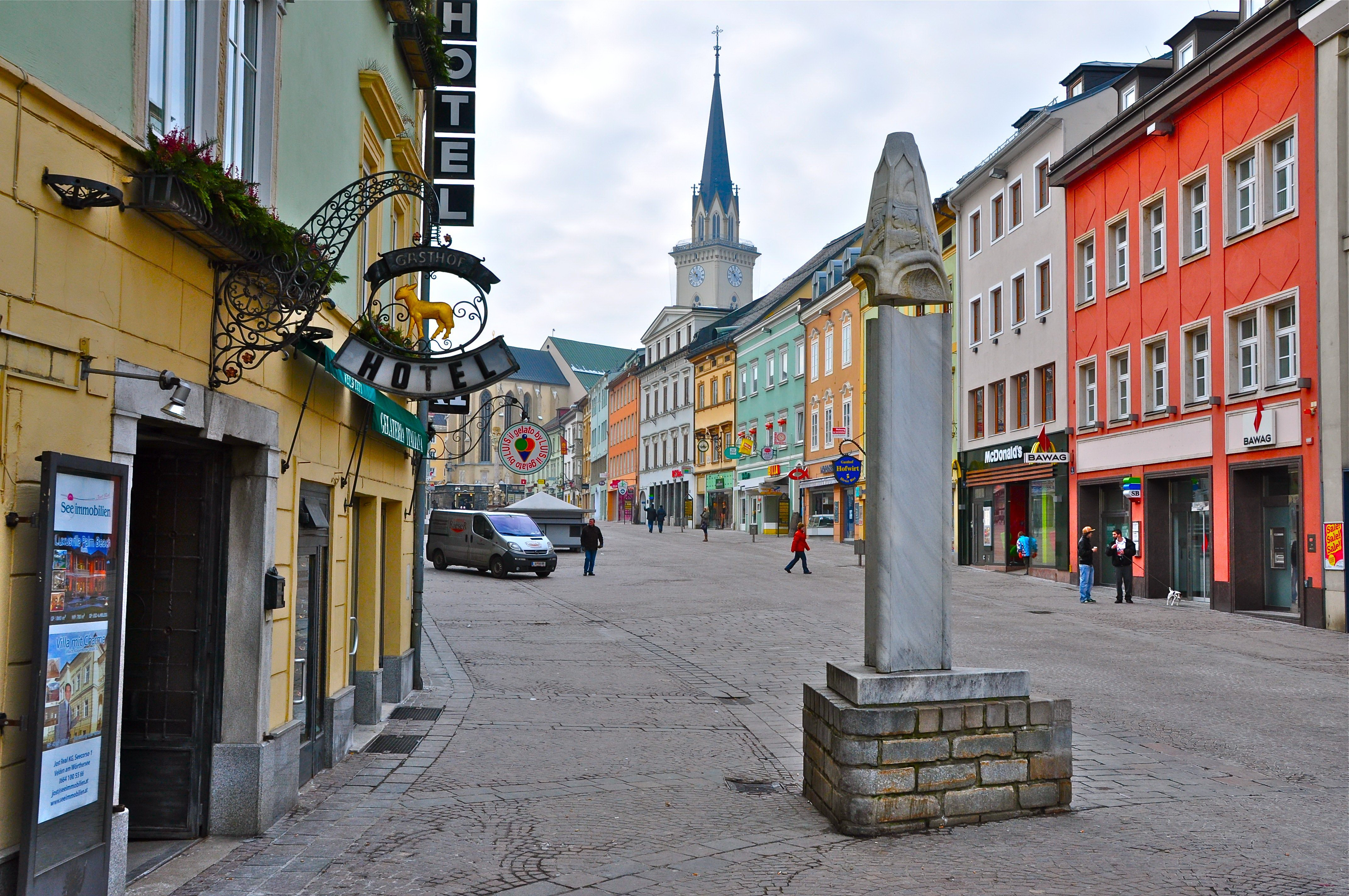
Main square

Villach is a statutory city, on the Drau River near its confluence with the Gail tributary, at the western rim of the Klagenfurt basin. The municipal area stretches from the slopes of the Gailtal Alps (Mt. Dobratsch) down to Lake Ossiach in the northeast.

The Villach city limits comprise the following districts and villages:

- Bogenfeld (Slovene: Vognje Polje)
- Dobrova (Dobrova)
- Drautschen (Dravče)
- Drobollach am Faaker See (Drobolje ob Baškem jezeru)
- Duel (Dole)
- Egg am Faaker See (Brdo ob Baškem jezeru)
- Goritschach (Goriče)
- Graschitz (Krošče)
- Gratschach (Grače pri Šentrupertu)
- Greuth (Rute pri Beljaku)
- Gritschach (Griče)
- Großsattel (Sedlo)
- Großvassach (Velike Laze pri Beljaku)
- Heiligen Gestade
- Heiligengeist (Sveti Duh)
- Kleinsattel (Malo Sedlo)
- Kleinvassach (Male Laze pri Beljaku)
- Kratschach (Hrašče pri Mariji na Zilji)
- Kumitz
- Landskron (Vajškra)
- Maria Gail (Marija na Zilji)
- Mittewald ober dem Faaker See (Na Dobrovi)
- Mittewald ob Villach
- Neufellach (Nova Bela)
- Neulandskron (Nova Vajškra)
- Obere Fellach (Gornja Bela)
- Oberfederaun (Gornji Vetrov)
- Oberschütt (Rogaje pod Dobračem)
- Oberwollanig
- Pogöriach (Pogorje)
- Prossowitsch (Prosoviče)
- Rennstein
- Serai (Seraje)
- St. Andrä
- St. Georgen
- St. Leonhard
- St. Magdalen
- St. Michael
- St. Niklas an der Drau (Miklavž na Dravi)
- St. Ruprecht
- St. Ulrich
- Tschinowitsch (Činoviče)
- Turdanitsch (Trdaniče pri Mariji na Zilji)
- Untere Fellach (Spodnja Bela)
- Unterfederaun (Pod Vetrovom)
- Unterschütt (Zabuče pri Brnci)
- Unterwollanig
- Urlaken
- Villach-Auen (Log pri Beljaku)
- Villach-Innere Stadt (Beljak - Mesto)
- Villach-Lind (Beljak - Lipa)
- Villach-Seebach-Wasenboden
- Villach-St. Agathen und Perau
- Villach-St. Martin
- Villach-Völkendorf
- Villach-Warmbad-Judendorf (Beljaške Toplice)
- Weißenbach
- Zauchen (Suha pri Vernberku)

In 1905 a part of the municipal area St. Martin was incorporated. In 1973 the city area was further enlarged through the incorporation of Landskron, Maria Gail and Fellach.

=== Climate ===
Villach has a cool summer humid continental climate (Köppen Dfb).

Climate data for Villach 1971-2000
Month	Jan	Feb	Mar	Apr	May	Jun	Jul	Aug	Sep	Oct	Nov	Dec	Year
Mean daily maximum °C (°F)	1.4 (34.5)	5.2 (41.4)	10.6 (51.1)	14.9 (58.8)	20.2 (68.4)	23.4 (74.1)	25.6 (78.1)	25.2 (77.4)	20.8 (69.4)	14.5 (58.1)	6.6 (43.9)	1.8 (35.2)	14.2 (57.6)
Daily mean °C (°F)	−3.2 (26.2)	−0.6 (30.9)	4.0 (39.2)	8.3 (46.9)	13.5 (56.3)	16.7 (62.1)	18.7 (65.7)	18.3 (64.9)	14.1 (57.4)	8.5 (47.3)	2.2 (36.0)	−2.1 (28.2)	8.2 (46.8)
Mean daily minimum °C (°F)	−6.4 (20.5)	−4.6 (23.7)	−0.8 (30.6)	3.1 (37.6)	7.9 (46.2)	11.1 (52.0)	12.9 (55.2)	12.8 (55.0)	9.2 (48.6)	4.6 (40.3)	−0.7 (30.7)	−4.8 (23.4)	3.7 (38.7)
Average precipitation mm (inches)	46.8 (1.84)	47.1 (1.85)	65.5 (2.58)	83.2 (3.28)	96.1 (3.78)	120.5 (4.74)	133.7 (5.26)	111.3 (4.38)	102.3 (4.03)	105.5 (4.15)	102.2 (4.02)	61.2 (2.41)	1,075.4 (42.34)
Average precipitation days (≥ 1.0 mm)	5.9	5.3	7.1	9.0	10.4	12.0	11.9	10.1	8.2	8.3	7.7	6.3	102.2
Mean monthly sunshine hours	84.4	120.3	160.6	167.7	208.4	214.3	245.2	227.2	190.3	142.0	85.9	73.2	1,919.5
Source: Zamg.ac.at

== History ==
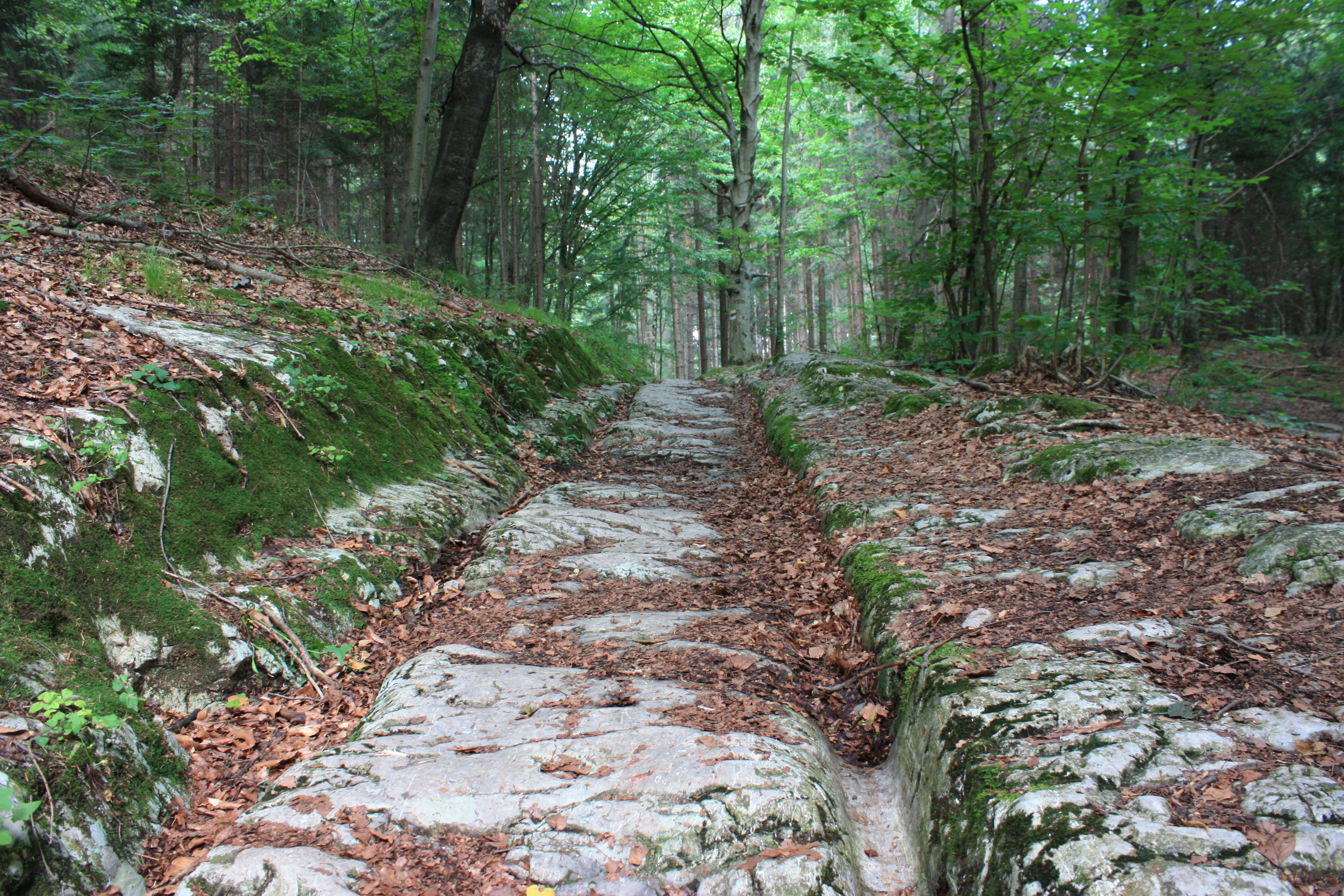
Roman road in Warmbad

The oldest human traces found in Villach date back to the late Neolithic. Many Roman artifacts have been discovered in the city and its vicinity, as it was near an important Roman road (today called Römerweg) leading from Italy into the Noricum province established in 15 BC. At the time, a mansio named Sanctium was probably located at the hot spring in the present-day Warmbad quarter south of the city centre. After the Migration Period and the Slavic settlement of the Eastern Alps about 600 AD, the area became part of the Carantania principality.

When about 740 Prince Boruth enlisted the aid of Duke Odilo of Bavaria against the invading Avars, he had to accept Bavarian overlordship. An 878 deed of donation, issued by the Carolingian ruler Carloman of Bavaria, mentioned a bridge (ad pontem Uillach) near the royal court of Treffen, in what is today Villach. In 979 Emperor Otto II enfeoffed Bishop Albuin of Brixen with the Villach manor. After his death, King Henry II in 1007 ceded the settlement to the newly established Bishopric of Bamberg. The bishops also held the adjacent estates along the strategically important route to Italy up to Pontafel, which they retained until 1759 while the surrounding Carinthian ducal lands passed to the Austrian House of Habsburg in 1335.

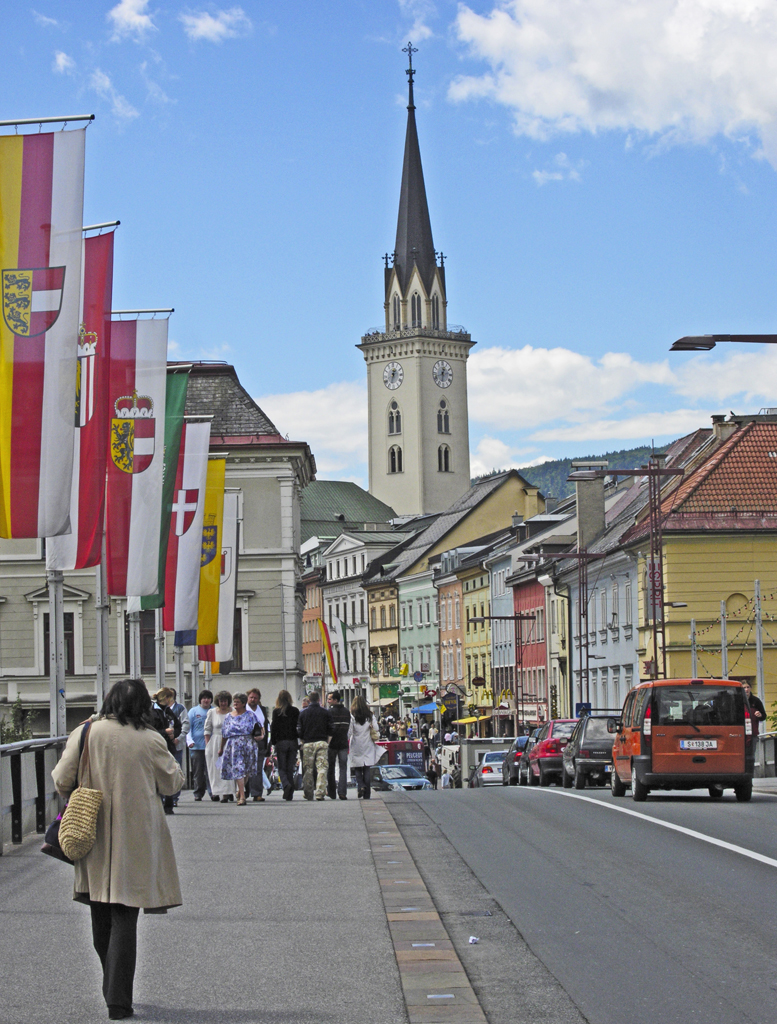
Drava bridge near the city centre

Villach received market rights in 1060, though it was not mentioned as a town in records until about 1240. The parish church dedicated to St. James was first documented in 1136. Emperor Frederick II conferred the citizens the right to hold an annual fair on the feast of 25 July (Jakobitag) in 1222. The 1348 Friuli earthquake devastated large parts of the town; another devastating earthquake occurred in 1690. There were also several fires in Villach, which destroyed many buildings. The first documented mayor took office in the 16th century.

From 1526 onwards, many citizens turned Protestant and the Villach parish became a centre of the new faith within the Carinthian estates, which entailed harsh Counter-Reformation measures by the ecclesiastical rulers. From about 1600, numerous residents were forced to leave the town, precipitating an economic decline. In 1759 the Habsburg empress Maria Theresa formally purchased the Bamberg territories in Carinthia for a price of one million florins. Villach was incorporated into the "hereditary lands" of the Habsburg monarchy and became the administrative seat of a Carinthian district.

During the Napoleonic Wars, the city was occupied by French troops and became part of the short-lived Illyrian Provinces from 1809, until it was re-conquered by the forces of the Austrian Empire in 1813 and incorporated into the Austrian Kingdom of Illyria by 1816. The city's economy was decisively promoted by a western branch of the Southern Railway line, which finally reached Villach in 1864, providing growth and expansion. By 1880, the town had a population of 6,104. In World War I, Villach near the Italian front was the seat of the 10th Army command of the Austro-Hungarian Army.

The town obtained statutory city status during the interwar period on 1 January 1932. After the Austrian Anschluss to Nazi Germany in 1938, the mayor of Villach was Oskar Kraus, an enthusiastic Nazi. On 9 November 1938 Villach was a site of the nationwide Kristallnacht pogroms with violent attacks on the Jewish population. A memorial for the 1919 border conflict that led to the Carinthian Plebiscite caused controversy when it was inaugurated in 2002, as Kraus, who had not been especially prominent in the conflict, was the only person named.

During World War II, allied forces bombed Villach 37 times. About 42,500 bombs killed 300 people and damaged 85% of the buildings. Nevertheless, the city quickly recovered. Today, Villach is a bustling city with commerce and recreation, yet it retains its historic background.

On 15 February 2025, a 14-year-old boy was killed while five people were injured in a knife attack. A 23-year-old Syrian asylum seeker was arrested by two female police officers.

== Demographics ==
As of 2024, Villach had a population of 65,600; 76.0% of whom held Austrian citizenship and 74.9% of whom were born in Austria.

The age group under 20 years old accounted for 17.4% of the population, those aged between 20 and 64 made up 60.5%, and individuals aged 65 and over comprised the remaining 22.0%. Women accounted for 51.6% of the population.

50.4% of foreign citizens held citizenship from another EU member state. When looking at individual countries, Germany and Bosnia and Herzegovina account for the largest shares of foreign nationals.

Largest groups of foreign residents
Nationality	Population (2026)
Bosnia and Herzegovina	1,976
Croatia	1,935
Germany	1,928
Slovenia	1,026
Syria	956
Italy	927
Hungary	645
Romania	540
Afghanistan	536
Serbia	496
Russian Federation	481
Ukraine	439
Turkey	331
Bulgaria	316
North Macedonia	228
Kosovo	170
Poland	144
Slovakia	132
Iraq	130
Iran	129
Czech Republic	55

Historical population
Year	Pop.	±%
1910	27,451	—
1923	30,883	+12.5%
1934	34,085	+10.4%
1939	36,012	+5.7%
1951	43,358	+20.4%
1961	47,170	+8.8%
1971	51,112	+8.4%
1981	52,692	+3.1%
1991	54,640	+3.7%
2001	57,497	+5.2%
2011	59,285	+3.1%
2021	63,236	+6.7%
2025	65,749	+4.0%

== Politics ==
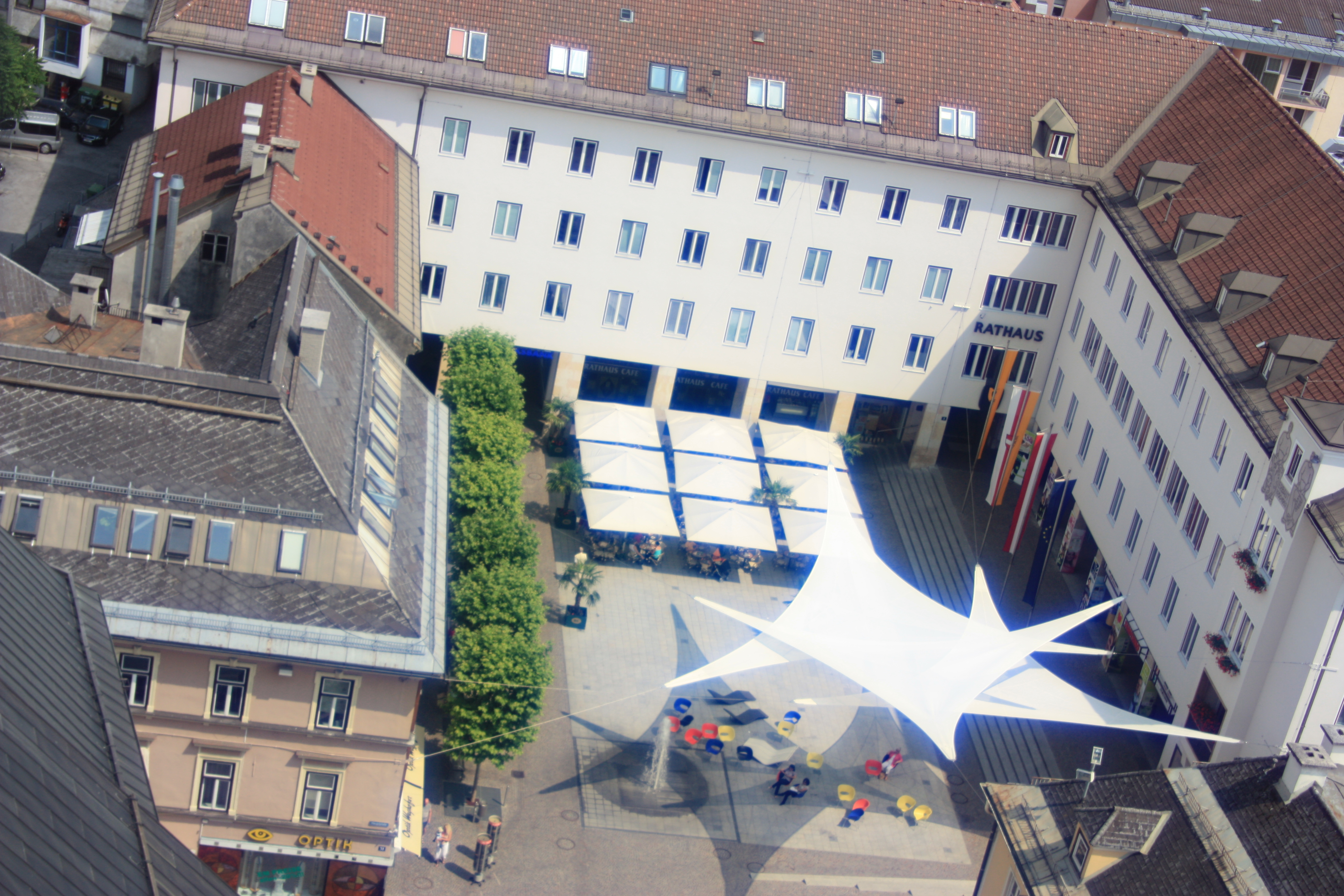
Town hall

=== Municipal council ===
The municipal council (Gemeinderat) consists of 45 members, with the mayor acting as president. Since the 2021 local elections, it is made up of the following parties:

- Social Democratic Party of Austria (SPÖ): 25 seats
- Freedom Party of Austria (FPÖ): 7 seats
- Austrian People's Party (ÖVP): 6 seats
- Verantwortung Erde (ERDE): 5 seats
- The Greens - The Green Alternative (GRÜNE): 2 seats

The mayor of the city, Günther Albel, was re-elected in 2021.

=== City government ===
The city government of Villach (Stadtsenat) consists of seven members. It is chaired by the mayor. The other members—two vice-mayors and four town councillors—are appointed by the municipal council, with party affiliations according to the election results.

- Mayor Günther Albel (SPÖ)
- First Deputy Mayor Sarah Katholnig (SPÖ)
- Second Deputy Mayor Gerda Sandriesser (SPÖ)
- Councillor Harald Sobe (SPÖ)
- Councillor Erwin Baumann (FPÖ)
- Councillor Christian Pober (ÖVP)
- Councillor Sascha Jabali Adeh (ERDE)

=== Carinthian state election ===
The results of the 2023 Carinthian state election for Villach are as follows:

- Social Democratic Party of Austria (SPÖ): 43.36%
- Freedom Party of Austria (FPÖ): 25.25%
- Austrian People's Party (ÖVP): 11.10%
- Team Carinthia (TK): 8.61%
- The Greens - The Green Alternative (GRÜNE): 5.03%
- NEOS - The New Austria and Liberal Forum (NEOS): 2.90%
- Others: 3.64%

=== Austrian legislative election ===
The results of the 2024 Austrian legislative election for Villach are as follows:

- Freedom Party of Austria (FPÖ): 36.67%
- Social Democratic Party of Austria (SPÖ): 25.79%
- Austrian People's Party (ÖVP): 17.42%
- NEOS - The New Austria and Liberal Forum (NEOS): 8.71%
- The Greens - The Green Alternative (GRÜNE): 5.87%
- Others: 5.54%

=== European parliament election ===
The results of the 2024 European parliament election for Villach are as follows:

- Freedom Party of Austria (FPÖ): 32.12%
- Social Democratic Party of Austria (SPÖ): 29.78%
- Austrian People's Party (ÖVP): 14.20%
- NEOS - The New Austria and Liberal Forum (NEOS): 10.56%
- The Greens - The Green Alternative (GRÜNE): 7.85%
- Others: 5.49%

== Twin towns—sister cities ==
Villach is twinned with:

- Bamberg, Germany (since 1973)
- Udine, Italy (since 1979)
- Suresnes, France (since 1992)
- Kranj, Slovenia (since 2008)
- Tolmin, Slovenia (since 2010)

== Transport ==
Villach Hauptbahnhof is an important regional, national and international rail hub, located close to the city centre. The nearest airport is Klagenfurt Airport, located 40 km (25 mi) east of the city.

== Festivals ==
=== K3 Film Festival ===
The K3 Film Festival has taken place annually since 2007. It is held in December over five days, and focuses on the filmmaking of Carinthia (Southern Austria), Friuli-Venezia Giulia (Northern Italy), and Slovenia. The name is derived from "K" standing for Kino (meaning "cinema" in German and Slovenian) and "3" referring to the fewest number of legs necessary to create a solid table.

=== Other festivals ===
There are several other festivals throughout the year, including:

- The carnival in Villach (which starts on November 11 and ends on March 4)
- Villacher Fasching or Mardi Gras
- Kunsthandwerkmarkt - arts and crafts festival
- The streets-art festival (displays performances of artists and singers)
- The Villacher Kirchtag (a festival spanning a whole week in summer and ends on August's first Saturday)
- DRAUPULS - light shows on the Drau river

== Notable citizens ==
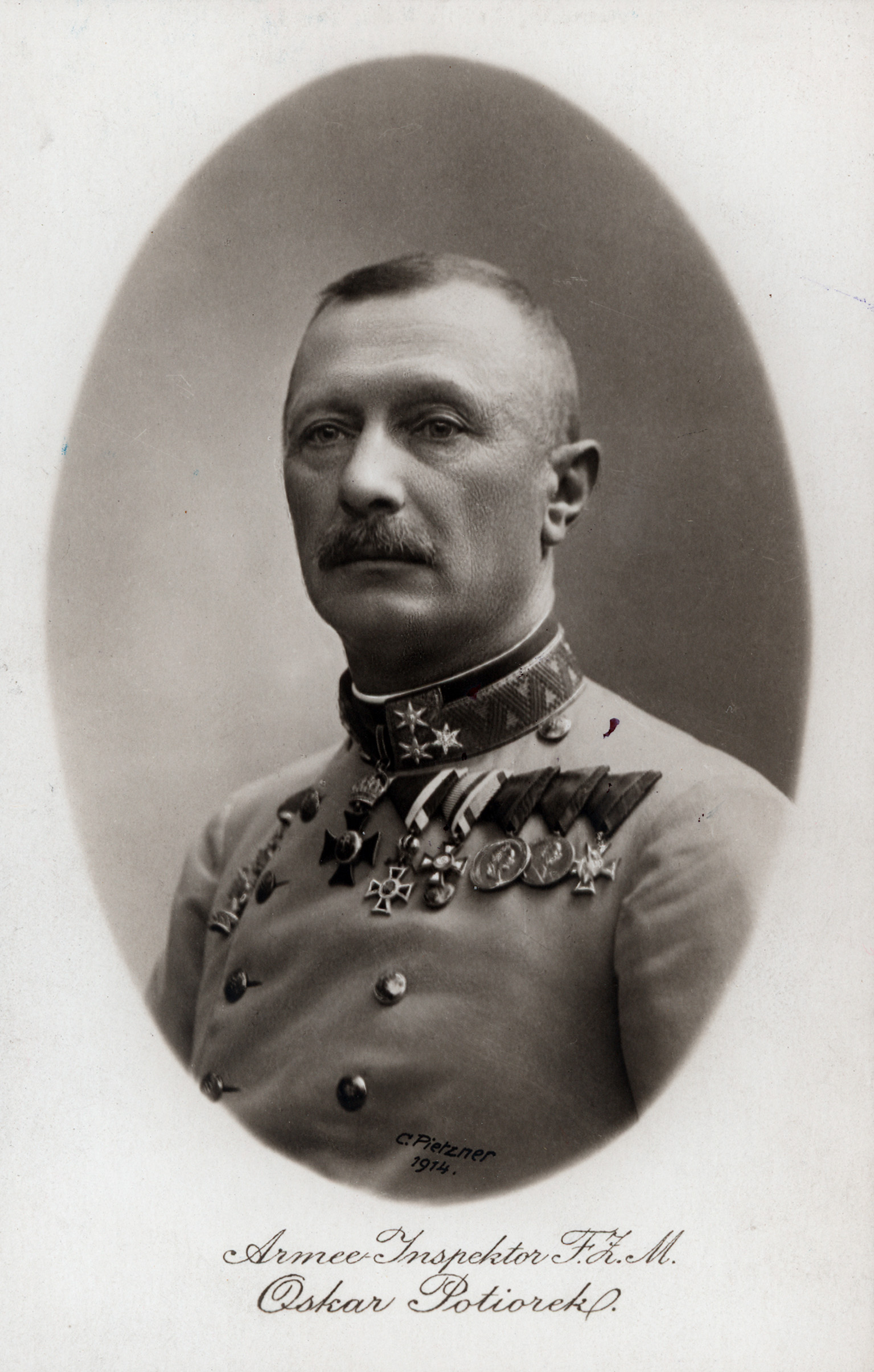
Oskar Potiorek, 1908

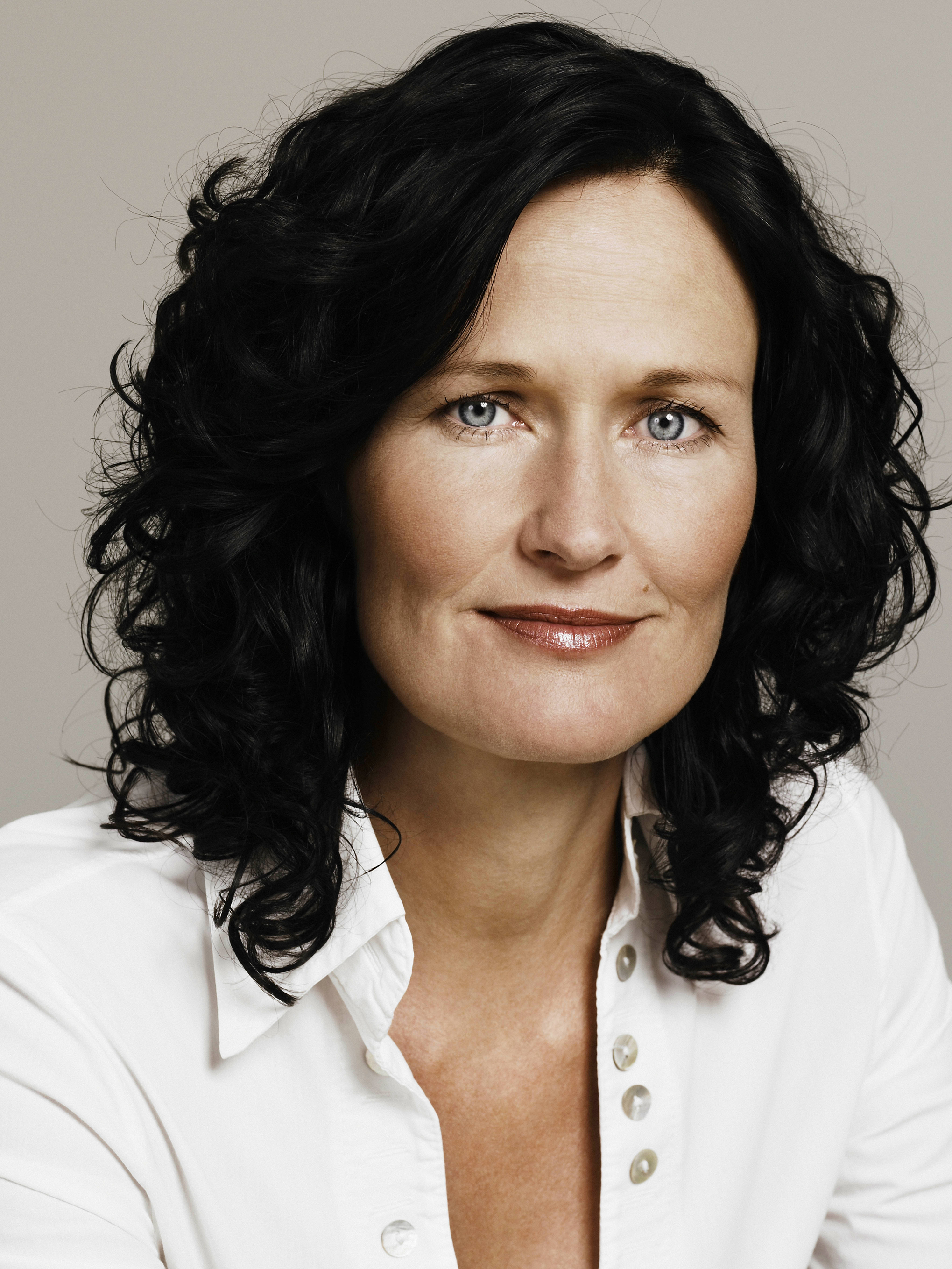
Eva Glawischnig, 2006

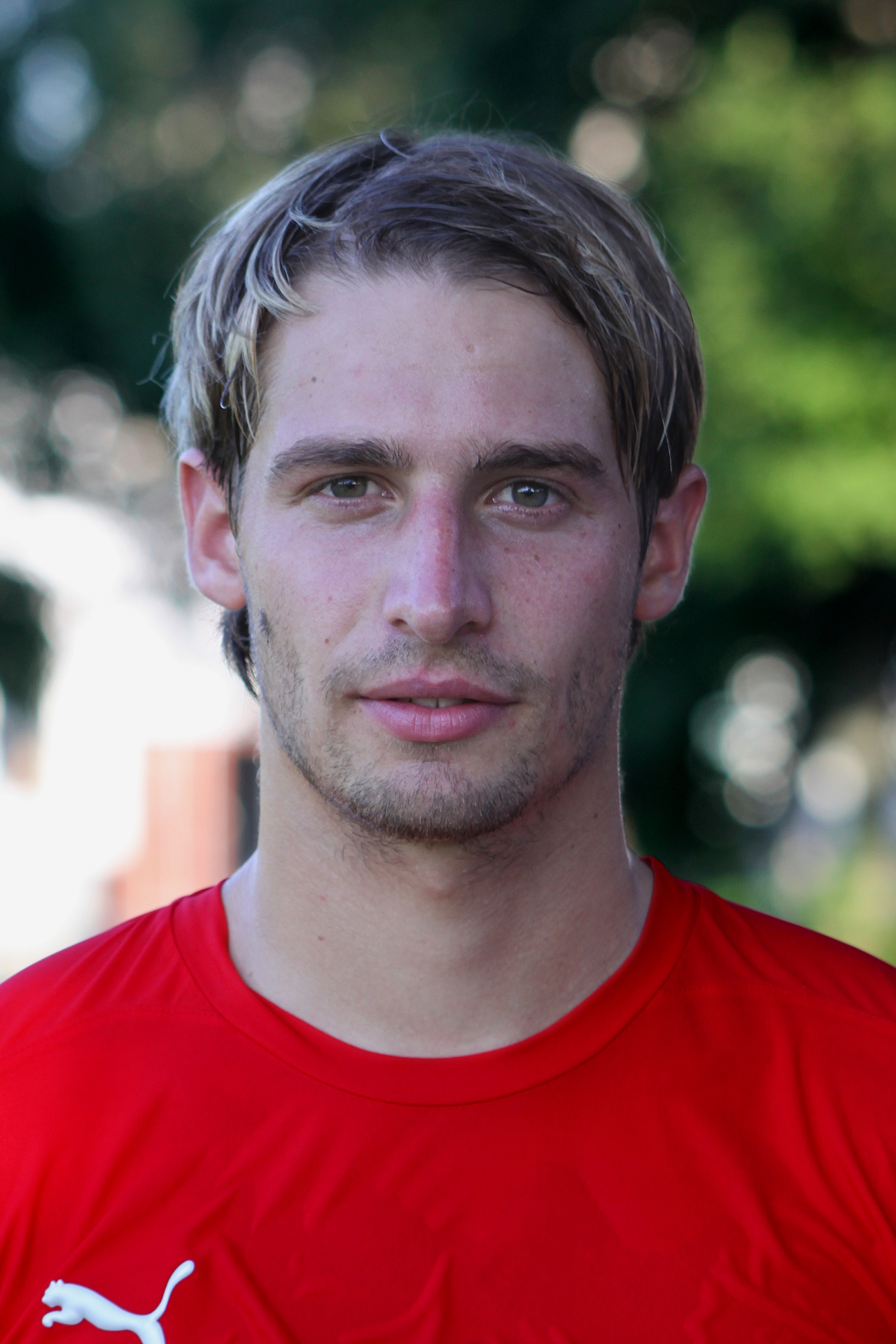
Marc Sand, 2009

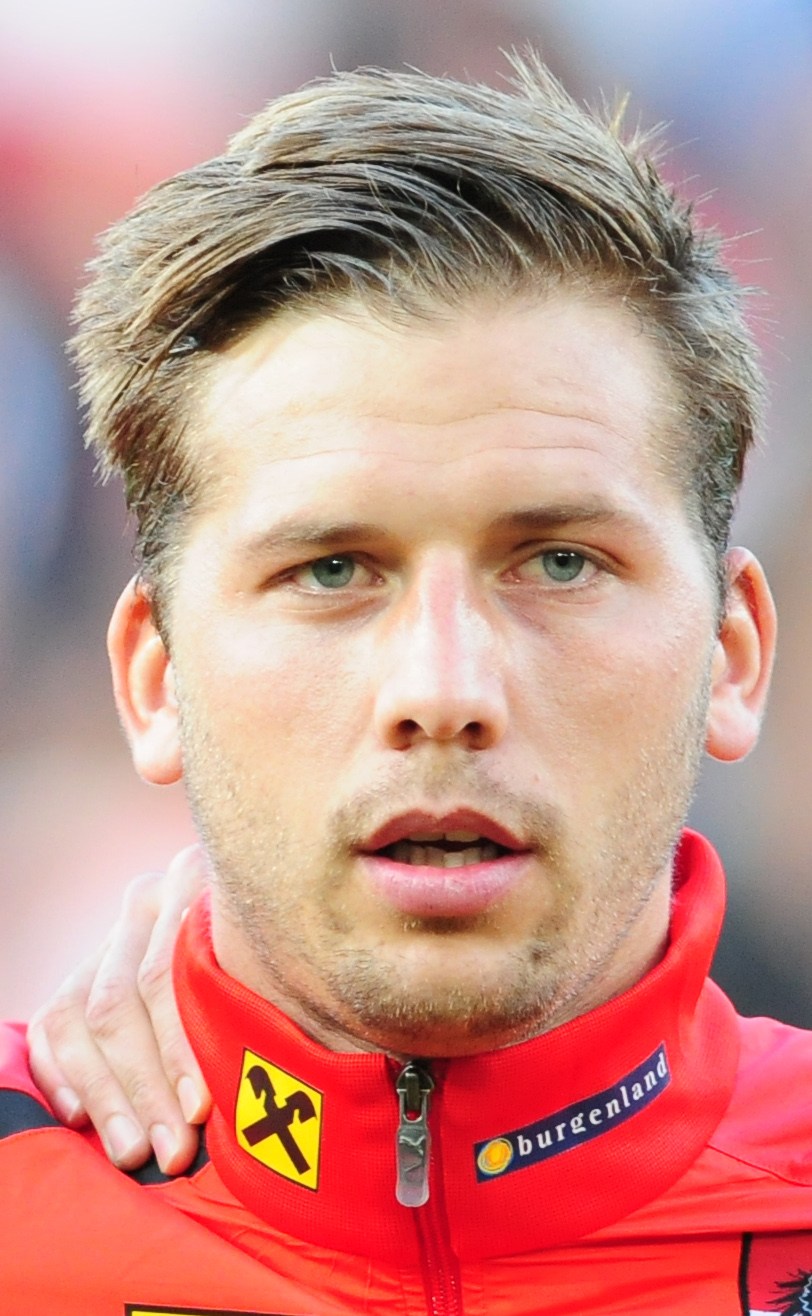
Guido Burgstaller, 2012

- Ludwig Willroider (1845–1910), an Austrian landscape painter and etcher.
- Oskar Potiorek (1853 in Bad Bleiberg – 1933), Austro-Hungarian Army officer, Governor of Bosnia and Herzegovina in Sarajevo from 1911 to 1914, when Archduke Franz Ferdinand of Austria was assassinated there
- Anton Ghon (1866 in Villach – 1936), Austrian pathologist viz Ghon focus and Ghon's complex
- Oskar Kraus, (DE Wiki) (1887–1973 in Villach), mayor of Villach 1938–1945
- Hans Kurath (1891 in Villach – 1992), American linguist, emigrated to the US in 1907
- Carl-Heinz Birnbacher (1910 in Villach – 1991), German naval officer, Vice admiral of the German Navy
- Albert Bach (1910 in Treffen – 2003), soldier, Generalmajor, and skier, competed at the 1936 Winter Olympics.
- Gisela Tschofenig (1917 in Villach – 1945), Austrian resistance activist
- Heidemarie Hatheyer (1918 in Villach – 1990), film actress, appearing in 43 films between 1938 and 1988
- Paul Watzlawick (1921 in Villach – 2007), Austrian-American therapist, psychologist and communications theorist.
- Kurt Diemberger (born 1932), author and mountaineer
- Bruno Gironcoli (1936 in Villach – 2010), Austrian modern artist
- Heidelinde Weis (1940–2023), Austrian actress
- Peter Brabeck-Letmathe (born 1944 in Villach), former CEO of the Nestlé Group and of Formula One Group
- George Zebrowski (born 1945 in Villach), American science fiction author and editor
- Zoltan J. Acs (born 1947 in Villach), American economist and Professor of Management at The LSE
- Felix Tretter (born 1949 in Villach), Austrian psychologist, psychiatrist and cybernetician
- Werner Kofler (1947 in Villach – 2011), Austrian postmodernism novelist
- Konrad Paul Liessmann (born 1953), philosopher, essayist and cultural publicist.
- Gerald Kargl (born 1953 in Villach), Austrian film director, directed the 1983 film Angst
- Wolfgang Ilgenfritz (1957 in Villach – 2013), Austrian politician and notably a non-attached MEP
- Gernot Rumpold (born 1957 in Villach), Austrian politician, associate of Jörg Haider
- Peter Löscher (born 1957 in Villach), Austrian businessman with Merck & Co and former CEO of Siemens
- Michael Martin Kofler (born 1966), classical flautist with the Munich Philharmonic
- Eva Glawischnig-Piesczek (born 1969 in Villach), Austrian politician of the Austrian Green Party
- Alexander Kaimbacher (born 1969), Austrian operatic tenor
- Thomas Smolej (1982 in Villach), Austrian actor and director
- Florian Hufsky (1986 in Villach – 2009), Austrian new media artist, board member of the Pirate Party of Austria

=== Sport ===
- Ernst Melchior (1920 in Villach – 1978), Austrian football player for Austria Wien, FC Rouen and FC Nantes, he played almost 400 games and 36 games for Austria
- Hanns Brandstätter (born 1949 in Villach), fencer; competed in at the 72, 76, and 1984 Summer Olympics
- Alex Antonitsch (born 1966 in Villach), former tennis player from Austria, turned professional in 1988
- Christian Mayer (born 1972), former alpine skier, twice bronze medallist in the 1994 & 1998 Winter Olympics
- Bärbel Jungmeier (born 1975 in Villach), road cyclist and mountain bike rider, rode at the 2004 Summer Olympics
- Gerhard Unterluggauer (born 1976 in Villach), Austrian former professional ice hockey defenceman
- Roland Kollmann (born 1976 in Villach), retired footballer for Grazer AK, played 343 games and 11 for Austria
- Daniel Mesotitsch (born 1976 in Villach), Austrian biathlete twice Olympic team medallist
- Jürgen Pichorner (born 1977), an Austrian football midfielder who has played over 330 games
- Friedrich Pinter (born 1978 in Villach), Austrian former biathlete
- Martin Koch (born 1982 in Villach), former ski jumper, team gold medallist at the 2006 Winter Olympics
- Michael Grabner, (born 1987 in Villach), Austrian professional ice hockey player for New York Rangers of the NHL
- Marc Sand (born 1988 in Rosegg), Austrian footballer, who plays for SK Austria Klagenfurt
- Michael Raffl (born 1988 in Villach), professional ice hockey left winger for Dallas Stars of the NHL
- Guido Burgstaller (born 1989 in Villach), footballer who plays for Rapid Wien, has played 26 games for Austria
- Christopher Wernitznig (born 1990), an Austrian footballer who has played over 470 games
- Anna Gasser (born 1991 in Villach), snowboarder, two-time Olympic gold medalist in Big Air (2018 and 2022)
- Marco Schwarz (born 1995 in Villach), Austrian World Cup alpine ski racer
- Christopher Höher (born 1997 in Villach), Austrian racing driver
- Daniela Ulbing (born 1998), an Austrian snowboarder, silver medallist at the 2022 Winter Olympics
