= Rainer Liedtke =

German scientist (1943–2012)

Rainer Kurt Liedtke (September 16, 1943 – September 15, 2012) was a German physician, scientist, and entrepreneur who specialised in the theory and practice of biomedical information systems and medical innovation, and new therapies of pain, stress, and cell degeneration.

== Background ==
Liedtke was born in Königsberg, East Prussia, and died in Grünwald, Bavaria. Doctor's degree in medicine: Biochemical studies on DNA and RNA (Institute of physiological Chemistry, University of Bonn); Institute of Pharmacology University of Bonn; Physician at hospital for several years (i. a Women Hospital University of Bonn) and initial research, i.a. by order of the German Research Foundation; Hereafter several years pharmaceutical industry (i.a. as director of clinical research at Squibb, medical director at E. Lilly), parallel work as a university lecturer for pharmacology (i.a. University of Regensburg), invited lectures (Pharmacology) at i.a. University of Frankfurt. Company founder (i.a. American Pharmed Labs, renamed to EpiCept) and its Chairman & CEO for several years. Member of various scientific associations in the areas of pharmacology, endocrinology, and biological chemistry.

== Inventions and medical developments ==
These include biomedical information systems and a number of new transdermal therapies, e.g. transdermal hormonal contraception (1988), including its first time clinical proof (together with L. Wildt, University of Erlangen). Bioinformatics conception of a "transdermal therapy of neuromuscular pain" with sodium channel blockers (1993/94), including the first clinical proof of effectiveness in back pain and postoperative pain (1995) and first market product of its kind in the USA. Another US product (Lidoderm) that is based on the same conception is approved for postherpetic pain. Transdermal beta-blockers, including the first time clinical proof in hypertension (with W. Vetter, University of Zurich, H. Vetter, University of Bonn, W. Zidek, University of Münster (1987) and in Angina pectoris (with J. Bonelli, F. Gazo, University of Vienna (1988). Some technical basics and an actualized synopsis of these new findings have been published in a special volume of 'Drug Research' (1989). Transdermal insulin patch as an alternative to insulin injection, with a first time proof in preclinical studies (with K. Suwelack, K. Karzel, University of Bonn (1990) and in type II diabetics (with M. Sorger, H. Vetter, University of Bonn (1990). Antidepressive effect of oxytocin. This has been predicted with a new biocybernetics model (1998/99), hereafter these effects were also experimentally confirmed (with I. Neumann, University of Regensburg, R. Landgraf, Max-Planck-Institute, M. Ludwig, University of Edinburgh (2000); A model of a pathogenetic cell mechanism in arteriosclerosis (2006). Current Developments. "Intelligent" medical information systems; a new general theory on pain - though this was in the controversial and non-peer reviewed journal Medical Hypotheses. Arterial Vascular Effects of Non-steroidal Antiphlogistic Drugs – A Biochemical Model on an Intramural Induction of Arteriosclerosis (2008).

== Author and writer ==
Scientific publications, medical specialist books, medical information for patients, more than 100 international patent applications (focus: drug therapy, information technology). Books: i.a. 'Introduction in drug therapy' (in German; with K. Karzel, University of Bonn), 'Dictionary of clinical pharmacology' (in German; Editor), Drugs – a translator for patients, 'Pharmacology and clinical use of ACE inhibitors' (with F. Gross, University of Heidelberg), 'Relative Intelligence'. Scripts and articles on related areas (e.g. general pharmacology, biological intelligence, artificial intelligence), critical statements on new biological developments (e.g. genomics, gene food), partly also in an own medical blog.
