= Simon focus =

A Simon focus is a tuberculosis (TB) nodule that can form in the apex of the lung when a primary TB infection elsewhere in the body spreads to the lung apex via the bloodstream. Simon focus nodules are often calcified.

The initial lesion is usually a small focus of consolidation, less than 2 cm (0.79 in) in diameter and located within 1 to 2 cm (0.39 to 0.79 in) of the apical pleura. In adolescence, Simon foci may become reactivated and develop into Assmann foci. Such foci are sharply circumscribed, firm, gray-white to yellow areas that have a variable amount of central caseation and peripheral fibrosis.
