= Biomedical cybernetics =

Biomedical cybernetics investigates signal processing, decision making and control structures in living organisms. Applications of this research field are in biology, ecology and health sciences.

== Fields ==
- Biological cybernetics
- Medical cybernetics

== Methods ==
- Connectionism
- Decision theory
- Information theory
- Systeomics
- Systems theory

== See also ==
- Cybernetics
- Prosthetics
- List of biomedical cybernetics software
