= Medical cybernetics =

Branch of cybernetics applying systems theory in medicine

Medical cybernetics is a branch of cybernetics which has been heavily affected by the development of the computer, which applies the concepts of cybernetics to medical research and practice. At the intersection of systems biology, systems medicine and clinical applications it covers an emerging working program for the application of systems- and communication theory, connectionism and decision theory on biomedical research and health related questions.

== Overview ==
Medical cybernetics searches for quantitative descriptions of biological dynamics. It investigates intercausal networks in human biology, medical decision making and information processing structures in the living organism.

Approaches of medical cybernetics include:

- Systems theory in medical sciences: The scope of systems theory in the medical sciences is searching for and modelling of physiological dynamics in the intact and diseased organism. Its aim is to arrive at deeper insights into the organizational principles of life and its perturbations. Based on cybernetic models, improved diagnostical strategies and methods for personalised therapy of chronic diseases have been developed. With focus on medical application this field is also referred to as systems medicine.
- Medical information and communication theory: Motivated by the awareness of information being an essential principle of life, the application of communication theory to biomedicine aims at a mathematical description of signalling processes and information storage in different physiological layers. This attempt also includes theories on the information theory of the genetic code.
- Connectionism: Connectionistic models describe information processing in neural networks – thus forming a bridge between biological and technological research.
- Medical decision theory (MDT): The Goal of MDT is to gather evidence based foundations for decision making in the clinical setting.

== See also ==
Related fields

- Biocybernetics
- Complex systems
- Cybernetics
- Systems theory
- Prosthetics
- Systems biology
- Systems medicine

Related scientists

- Uri Alon
- William Ross Ashby
- Claude Bernard
- Valentin Braitenberg
- Walter Cannon
- Stephen Grossberg
- Humberto Maturana
- Warren McCulloch

Related scientists

- Walter Pitts
- Arturo Rosenblueth
- Robert Trappl
- Felix Tretter
- Francisco Varela
- Frederic Vester
- Kevin Warwick
- Paul Watzlawick

- List of biomedical cybernetics software
- List of medical cybernetics schools, Colleges and Universities
