= Anton Ghon =

Austrian pathologist and bacteriologist (1866–1936)

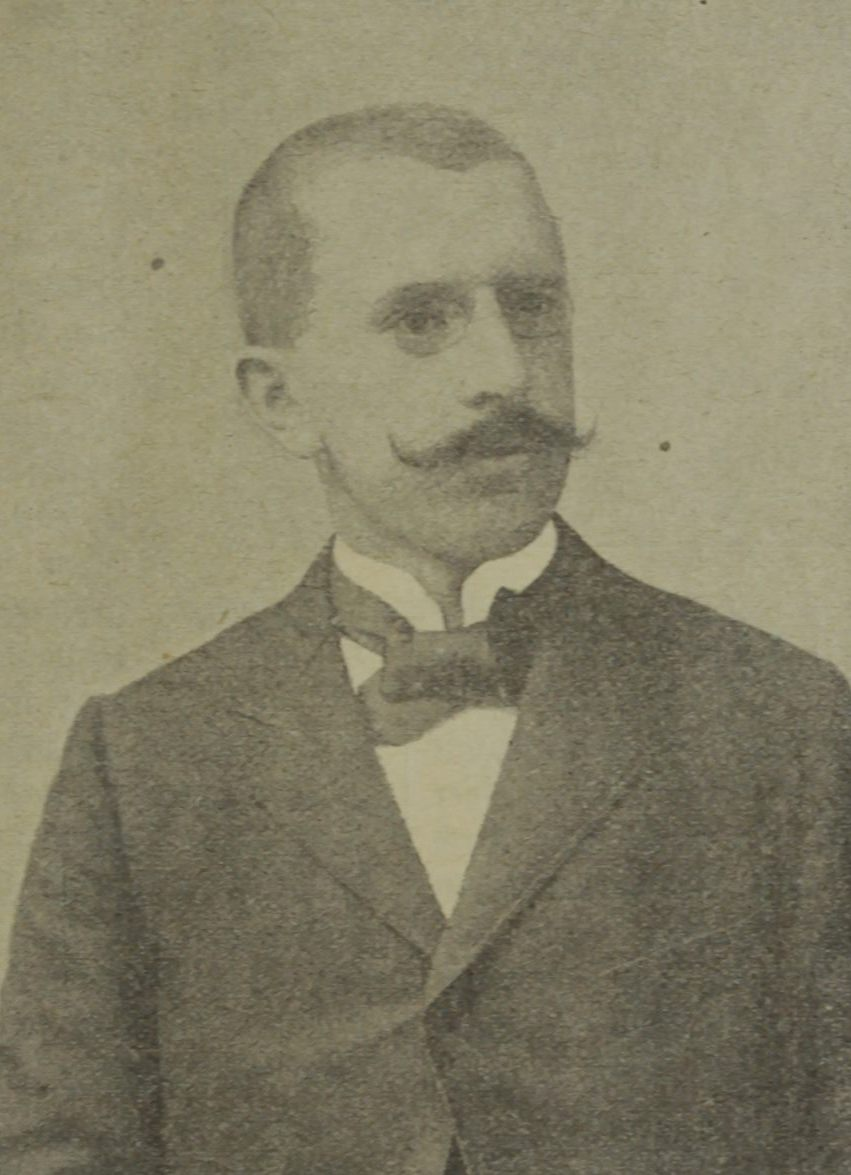
- Ghon in 1887
- Born: 1 January 1866; Villach, Austrian Empire
- Died: 23 April 1936 (aged 70); Prague, Czechoslovakia
- Education: University of Graz

Anton Ghon (1 January 1866 – 23 April 1936) was an Austrian pathologist and bacteriologist. He is best known for his research on tuberculosis (Ghon's complex).

== Biography ==
Ghon was born on January 1, 1866, in Villach.

From 1884 to 1890, Ghon studied medicine at the university in Graz. In 1890 he volunteered at the dermatologic clinic in Vienna. In 1892, he became an aspirant to the pathologic-anatomic division at Krankenanstalt Rudolfstiftung (Rudolf Foundation). In 1893, he worked as demonstrator to the chair of pathological histology and bacteriology and as of 1894 as assistant of Anton Weichselbaum (1845–1920) at the pathological-anatomical institute at the University of Vienna.

Anton Ghon travelled to Bombay in 1897 as a member of the Austrian delegation researching the bubonic plague. For their findings on aetiology, anatomical pathology and epidemiology, he and his colleagues were nominated for the Nobel Prize in 1901. Ghon completed his habilitation in 1899 in Vienna and was appointed associate professor in 1902. In 1910 he became full professor of pathological anatomy at the German University in Prague succeeding Richard Kretz. In 1910, Anton Ghon married Karoline Illatz in Vienna.

Ghon retired in 1935 and died in Prague on April 23, 1936, shortly after retiring from his university position. His body was transferred to his hometown Villach and laid to rest in the family tomb.

== Work ==
Ghon linked bacteriological and anatomic-histological methods for exploring gram-negative diplococci, the pathogens of influenza and gas gangrene (the bacillus oedematis maligni was also called Ghon-Sachs bacillus) as well as tuberculosis. He was a specialist in the field of bacteriology, and is remembered for his work with meningitis and tuberculosis. His name is lent to Ghon focus, which is a primary infection associated with tuberculosis, as well as Ghon's complex — when the aforementioned infection involves surrounding lymph nodes. His best written effort is a 1912 treatise of childhood tuberculosis called Der primäre Lungenherd bei der Tuberkulose der Kinder.

== Honours ==
- 1898: Goldenes Verdienstkreuz mit der Krone (Golden Cross of Merit with the Crown)
- 1899: Corresponding member of the Academy of Sciences in Vienna
- 1936: Honorary citizen (of Villach)

== Written works ==
- Der primäre Lungenherd bei der Tuberkulose der Kinder, (1912).
- Publications about Anton Ghon:
- "Ghon, but not forgotten, (Anton Ghon and his complex)"; WB Ober (1983).
