= Tuberculoma =

Tumor-like mass resulting from the enlargement of a tuberculous lesion

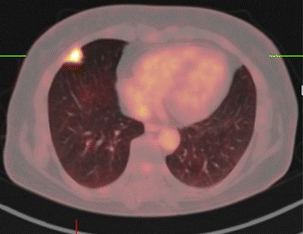
PET-CT of a tuberculoma

A tuberculoma is a clinical manifestation of tuberculosis which conglomerates tubercles into a firm lump, and so can mimic cancer tumors of many types in medical imaging studies. They often arise within individuals in whom a primary tuberculosis infection is not well controlled.

When tuberculomas arise intracranially, they represent a manifestation of CNS tuberculosis. Since these are evolutions of primary complex, the tuberculomas may contain caseum or calcifications.

With the passage of time, Mycobacterium tuberculosis can transform into crystals of calcium. These can affect any organ such as the brain, intestine, ovaries, breast, lungs, esophagus, pancreas, bones, and many others. Even with guideline-directed treatment they often persist for months to years.

== Mechanism ==
The exact mechanism of tuberculoma development has not been determined, although multiple theories have been proposed. It is possible that, following an initial tuberculosis infection resulting in bacteremia, a foci of granulomatous inflammation may coalesce into a caseous tuberculoma. Pulmonary tuberculomas may arise due to repeated cycles of necrosis and re-encapsulation of foci, or, alternatively, the shrinkage and fusion of encapsulated densities.

In regards to CNS tuberculoma, it is thought that mycobacterium tuberculosis is capable of penetrating the blood brain barrier after bacterial bacilli induce the release of cytokines by various immunologic cells, leading to an increase in barrier permeability. Similar to pulmonary tuberculomas, small lesions eventually coalesce and undergo both necrosis and enlargement.

== Signs and symptoms ==
Symptoms are based on the location of the tuberculoma. Small, scattered lesions may be asymptomatic. Intracranial tuberculomas in children are often infratentorial, occurring near the cerebellum and base of the brain. In this population, symptoms such as headache, fever, focal neurologic findings and seizures have been seen in addition to papilledema with or without meningitis. When the size of a brainstem tuberculoma grows to the point of narrowing the fourth ventricle, obstructing hydrocephalus and its related symptoms can arise. Rupture of tuberculomas adjacent to the arachnoid can lead to arachnoiditis, while rupture near the subarachnoid space or ventricular system can cause meningitis.

== Diagnosis ==
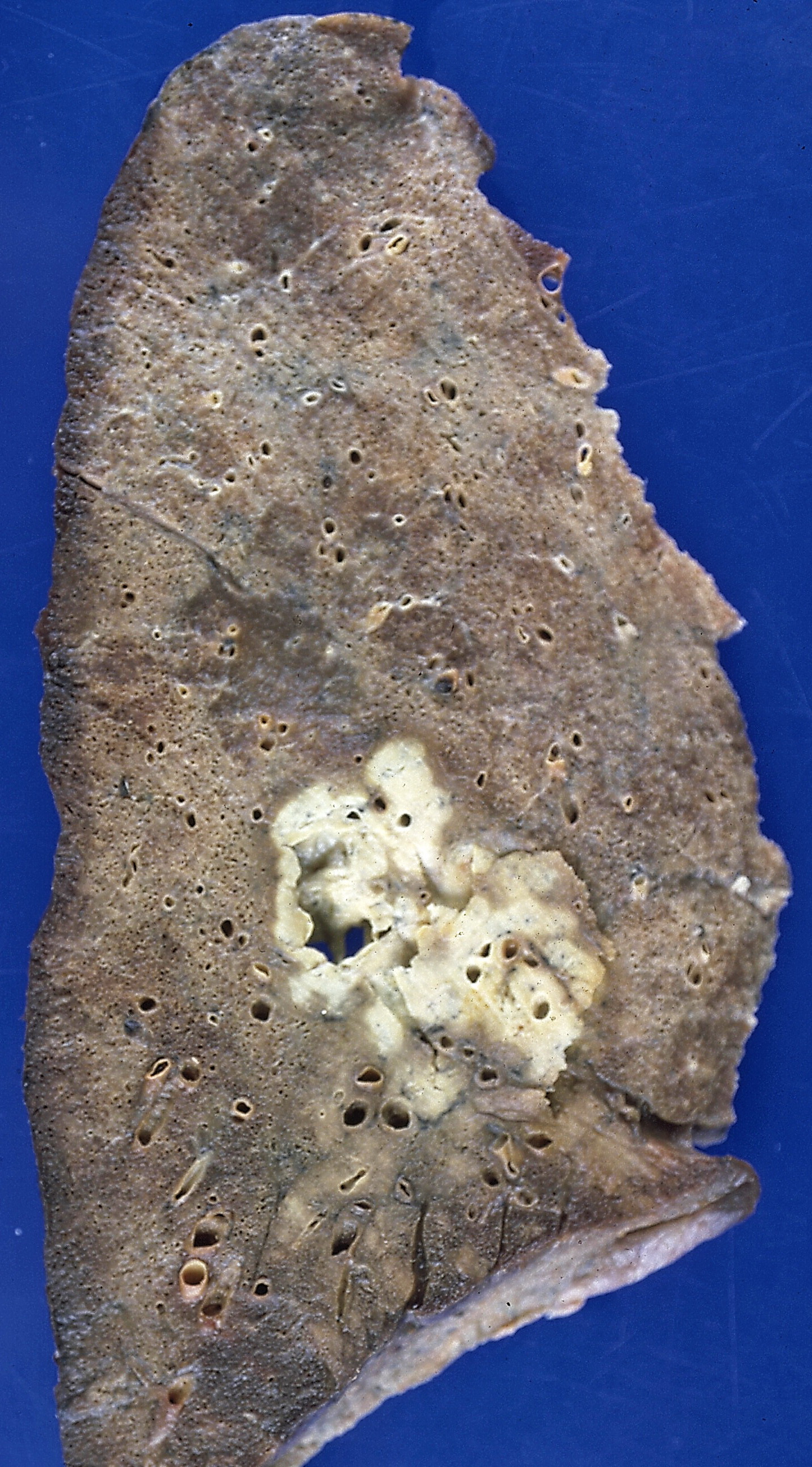
Tuberculoma With Cavitation

The diagnosis of tuberculoma can be challenging, as invasive testing may be required and, occasionally, concomitant malignancy may be present. In children with tuberculoma, CXR is often normal despite a positive TST/IGRA.

Diagnosis of brain tuberculoma can be aided with PCR of cerebrospinal fluid, but is of less utility for quickly diagnosing and treating lesions. When CSF is analyzed in patients with suspected tuberculoma, high protein concentrations and cell counts are often seen.

Definitive diagnosis can be made through stereotactic, CT-guided biopsy, with excision required in rare cases. Biopsy is chosen when non-invasive testing has failed to produce a diagnosis, when patients fail to respond to a treatment regimen, in cases of drug-resistant tuberculosis, and in non-compliant patients.

=== Imaging ===
The appearance of a tuberculoma on imaging can vary according to the composition and age of the mass. They may appear as either non-caseating or solidly caseating lesions. Initially, tuberculomas appear hypodense on computed tomography (CT) scans with significant surrounding edema. The "target sign" is pathognomonic for tuberculoma on CT, with a nodular ring-enhancing mass and central calcification. The characteristic ring-enhanced appearance is due to lack of blood supply in the central necrotic core that is visualized with injected contrast. Sometimes a hypodense central area is seen instead of calcification. When considering other potential intracranial masses in a differential diagnosis, such as cysticercosis, pyogenic abscess, and neoplastic lesions, tuberculoma can be identified by its larger size (>2 cm), edema, and irregular border.

Magnetic resonance imaging (MRI) is another useful imaging modality for diagnosing and characterizing of tuberculomas, especially solid caseous necrosis in which 3 zones of varying intensity are seen.

== Treatment ==
Tuberculoma is commonly treated through the HRZE drug combination (Isoniazid, Rifampin, Pyrazinamide, Ethambutol) followed by maintenance therapy. Per international guidelines, 9–12 months of medical management is standard. While the majority of tuberculomas resolve in 12–24 months, in patients with multiple or larger lesions prolonged treatment extending beyond two years may be required. In some patients, the release of inflammatory mediators during treatment can cause a paradoxical worsening of symptoms that is treated with anti-inflammatory medications in addition to the standard anti-tuberculosis regimen.

Exceptionally large tuberculomas, those exerting a mass effect on the brain, and those which fail to respond to medical management required surgical excision. In some cases, surgical excision is necessary for diagnosis as well as treatment. When intracranial pressure rises in the setting of tuberculoma, removal is considered a surgical emergency.

== Prognosis ==
Of patients with a brain tuberculoma treated with an appropriate medication regimen, almost half recover completely. Approximately 10% of those treated fail to recover and succumb to the tuberculoma. Reports issued before the advent of effective anti-tuberculosis therapy showed that, when untreated, 30-50% of tuberculomas enter and remain in a stationary course.

== Epidemiology ==
Tuberculomas are most commonly seen in areas where tuberculosis is endemic. In these areas, tuberculomas can account for between 30%-50% of intracranial masses. India and parts of Asia are two areas where tuberculomas have been noted to be particularly prevalent. They occur most often as solitary, infratentorial lesions in young children. In contrast, lesions are most often supratentorial in adults.

Pulmonary tuberculomas are among the most common benign nodules, with 5%-24% of all resected nodules being of tuberculous origin. In areas of lower prevalence, such as the United States, they are most commonly seen in the setting of an acquired immunodeficiency. Intracerebral tuberculomas, specifically, are more frequently observed in patients with an HIV infection.
