= Max Sandreczky =

Max Sandreczky (1839–1899) was a German Christian pediatric surgeon who settled in Jerusalem with his father Carl Sandreczki in 1868, where in 1872 he established and ran the first pediatric hospital in Palestine. He became well known both for his progressive approach to pediatric medicine, and for his humanism in treating children of all faiths, Muslim, Christian and Jewish, without any attempt at proselytising.

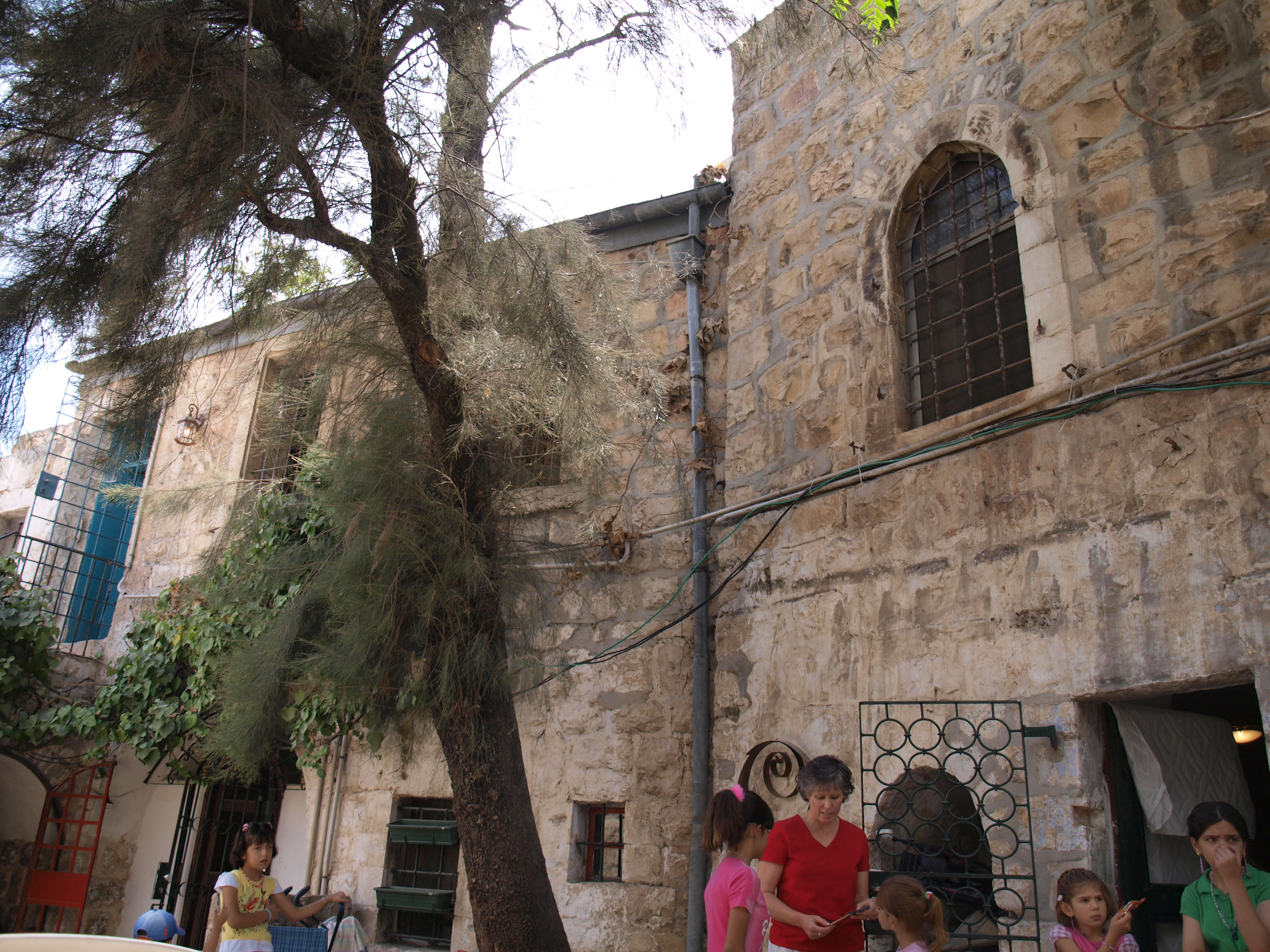
Sandreczky's Marienstift Children's Hospital, Street of the Prophets, Jerusalem

== Biography ==
Max Sandreczky was born on Syros, to missionary Carl Sandreczki. In the early 1860s he worked in Munich as the assistant of another pioneering German pediatrician, Heinrich von Ranke. He developed an understanding of the importance of psychological factors for the well-being of sick children; the nature of leprosy; and the role of bacteria and fungi in causing infections. Some of his progressive methods were the use of occupational therapy for children, and allowing for mothers to live in the hospital during their children's stay there.

In failing health, Sandreczky killed himself on June 22, 1899, at the age of 60, haunted by fears that he would become a burden to his family and not be able to continue helping sick children. Shortly after his death the hospital closed down. Sandreczky's grave is preserved in the Protestant Mount Zion Cemetery, Jerusalem.

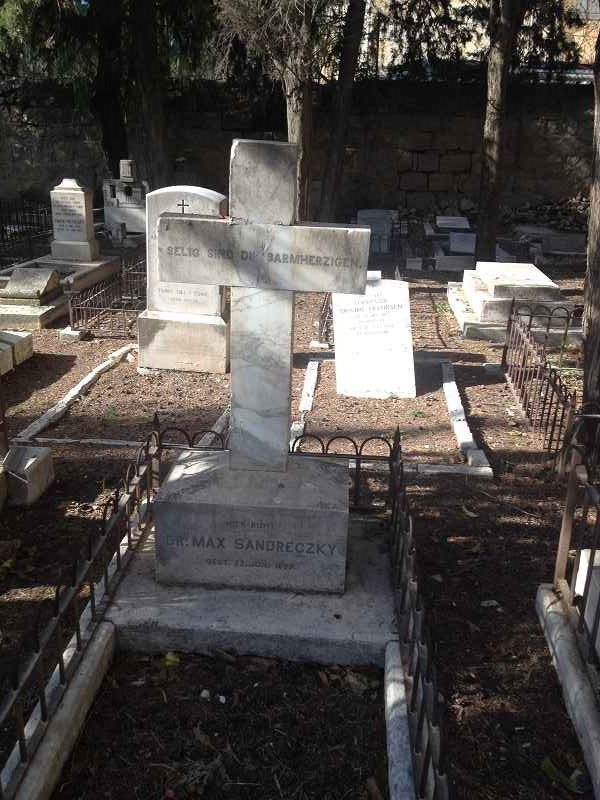
Grave of Sandreczky in the Protestant Mount Zion Cemetery, Jerusalem

== Marienstift children's hospital ==
Sandreczky's hospital was named "Marienstift Kinderhospital", or "Children's Hospital of the Marie Foundation", after Princess Marie of Schwarzburg-Rudolstadt, third wife of Grand Duke Frederick Francis II of Mecklenburg-Schwerin who provided initial financial support until his death in 1883. The hospital operated from 1872-1899. Sandreczky was the sole physician. The staff included his wife and three of his daughters, who worked as nurses, and a young Jewish pharmacist. The hospital was known for its humanistic approach and served sick children from all religions: Muslim, Christian and Jewish. As Sandreczky did not proselytize the children in his care, he could not obtain funding from church institutions, as did all hospitals in Jerusalem at the time.

In 1979, the building was purchased by an investment company which planned to build a commercial center there. The blueprints included restoration of the building and the establishment of a small historic exhibit. The Society for the Preservation of Israel Heritage Sites took the case to court and blocked the plan.

== Awards and recognition ==
During the 1898 visit of Kaiser Wilhelm II to Jerusalem, Sandreczky was awarded the Order of the Red Eagle.

== See also ==
- Health care in Israel
