= Ghon's complex =

Lung lesion caused by tuberculosis

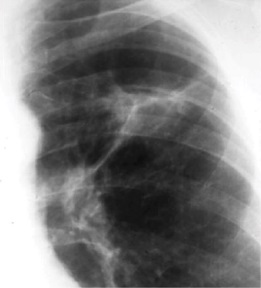
Chest x-ray of Ghon's complex of active tuberculosis

Ghon's complex is a lesion seen in the lung that is caused by tuberculosis. The lesions consist of a Ghon focus along with pulmonary lymphadenopathy within a nearby pulmonary lymph node. A Ghon's complex retains viable bacteria, making them sources of long-term infection, which may reactivate and trigger secondary tuberculosis later in life.

In countries where cow milk infected with Mycobacterium bovis has been eliminated (due to culling of infected cows and pasteurization), primary tuberculosis is usually caused by Mycobacterium tuberculosis and almost always begins in the lungs. Typically, the inhaled bacilli implant in the distal airspaces of the lower part of the upper lobe or the upper part of the lower lobe, usually close to the pleura. As sensitization develops, a 1 to 1.5 cm area of gray-white inflammation with consolidation emerges, known as the Ghon focus. In most cases, the center of this focus undergoes caseous necrosis. Tubercle bacilli, either free or within phagocytes, drain to the regional nodes, which also often caseate. This combination of parenchymal lung lesion and nodal involvement is referred to as the Ghon complex. During the first few weeks, there is also lymphatic and hematogenous dissemination to other parts of the body.

In approximately 95% of cases, development of cell-mediated immunity controls the infection.

== Differentiation ==
The Ghon complex undergoes progressive fibrosis, often followed by radiologically detectable calcification (Ranke complex), and despite seeding of other organs, no lesions develop. Although they are often confused, Ranke complex and Ghon complex are not synonymous. The Ranke complex is an evolution of the Ghon complex (resulting from further healing and calcification of the lesion).

The Ghon complex is named after Austrian pathologist Anton Ghon; the Ranke complex is named in honour of German pulmonologist Karl Ernst Ranke.
