= Karl Ernst Ranke =

Karl Ernst Ranke (29 January 1870 in Munich – 9 November 1926 in Munich) was a German internist, pediatrician and pulmonologist known for his research of tuberculosis. He was the son of anthropologist Johannes Ranke (1836–1916).

In 1896 he received his medical doctorate from the Ludwig-Maximilians-Universität München, then spent the following year as an assistant to his uncle, Heinrich von Ranke (1830–1909), at the pediatric clinic of the Ludwig-Maximilians-Universität München. Afterwards, he was in charge of an anthropological research expedition to Brazil. Following his return to Germany, he spent two additional years as an assistant in the pediatric clinic, then relocated to Arosa, Switzerland, where he worked as a doctor in a tuberculosis sanatorium.

In 1906, he returned to the Ludwig-Maximilians-Universität München, where he practiced pediatrics, and specialized in diseases of the lung. In 1915, he earned his habilitation in internal medicine at the Ludwig-Maximilians-Universität München, and in 1921 became an associate professor. At the Ludwig-Maximilians-Universität München, he was director of the Fürsorgestelle für Lungenkranke. During the last decade of his life, he immersed himself in the philosophy of Immanuel Kant.

He is remembered for introducing the hypothesis that lung tuberculosis develops in three stages — referred to as Ranke Dreistadienlehre (also known as "Ranke's stages of tuberculosis"). His name is also associated with the so-called "Ranke complex", defined as a combination of late fibrocalcific lesions of the lung and lymph node that evolve from the Ghon complex.

== Selected works ==
- Über die Einwirkung des Tropenklimas auf die Ernährung des Menschen, auf Grund von versuchen im tropischen und subtropischen Südamerika, 1900 – On the influence of a tropical climate on human nutrition, etc.
- Anthropologische Beobachtungen aus Zentralbrasilien, 1906 – Anthropological observations in central Brazil.
- Die Kategorien des Lebendigen; eine Fortführung der Kant'schen Erkenntniskritik, 1928 – The categories of living; a continuation of the Kantian epistemology
- Ausgewählte Schriften zur Tuberkulose-pathologie, 1928 (with Walter Pagel) – Selected writings on tuberculosis pathology.
