= Carl Sandreczki =

German missionary in Palestine (1809–1892)

Carl Sandreczki (1809 – 1892) was a German missionary in Palestine.

== Biography ==
Carl Sandreczki, a Bavarian, studied law at the Ludwig-Maximilians-Universität München. He served as a judge under the administration of King Otto I of Greece, on the Cycladic island of Syros in the Aegean Sea. After converting from Catholicism to Protestantism, he was appointed secretary of the Church Missionary Society in Jerusalem. He settled there in 1851, after the establishment of the German Deaconesses Hospital in the Old City (now the compound housing the Maronite Convent), not far from Christ Church.

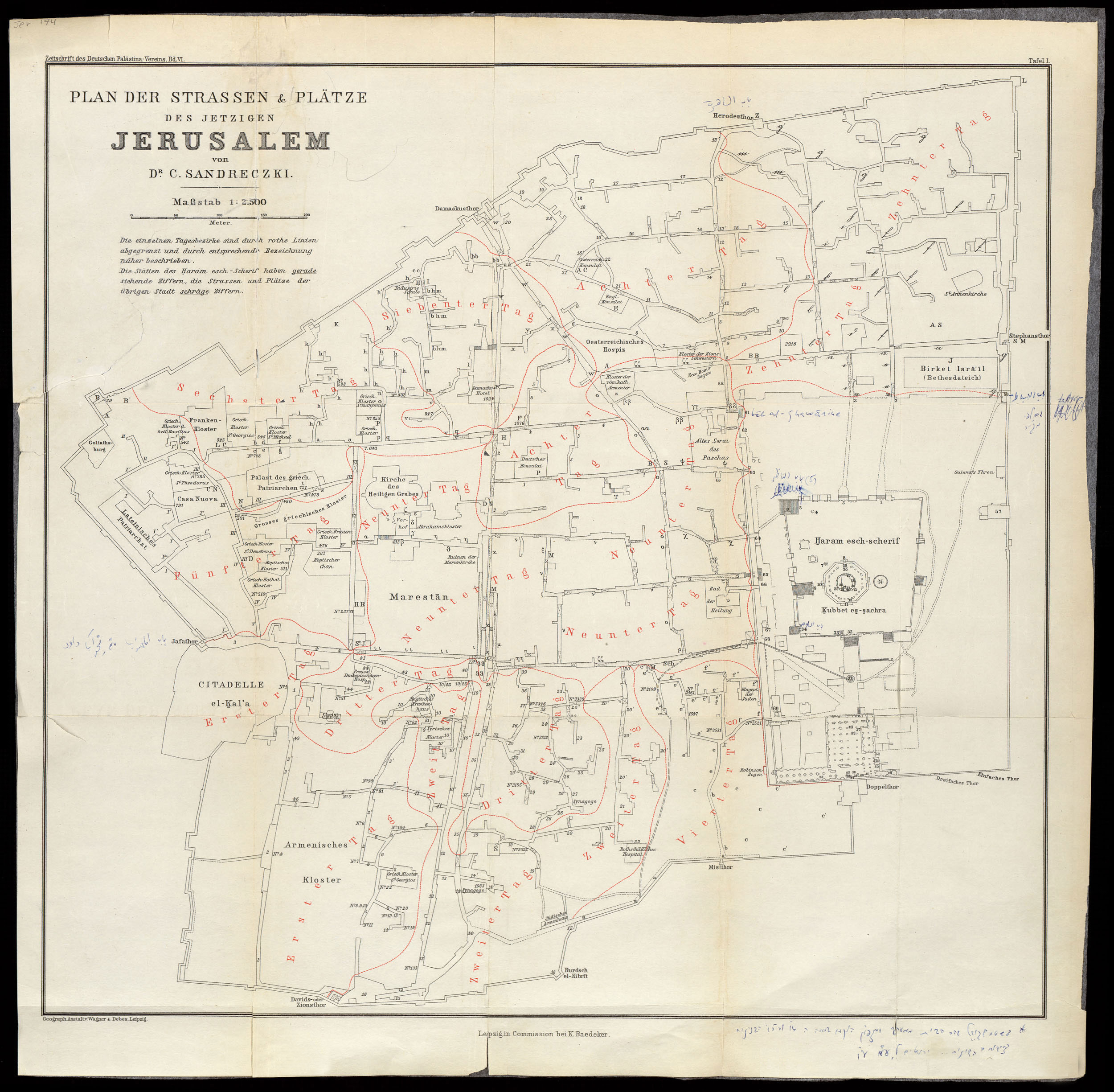
City plan of "contemporary Jerusalem" by Dr. C. Sandreczki, ZDPV Vol. VI, Leipzig 1883.

Sandreczki conducted a 10-day survey in which he documented the streets, gates and buildings of the city for the Ordnance Survey of Jerusalem and provided the Arabic names for locations, as well as two maps - one of the city, and one of the Temple Mount. The survey, Namen der Plätze, appeared in a shorter English version in Wilson's Ordnance Survey.

Carl Sandreczki's son, Max Sandreczky, was a pediatric surgeon in Jerusalem.

== Published works ==
- Carl Sandreczki (1867). "Die Heuschreckenplage in Palästina" [The plague of locusts in Palestine]. Wochenblatt der Johanniterballey Brandenburg VIII, Nr. 5. 6, pp. 29-36
- Carl Sandreczki (1868). "Warren's Ausgrabungen in Jerusalem" [Warren's excavations in Jerusalem]. Gotha: Mittheilungen aus Justus Perthes' Geographischer Anstalt über wichtige neue Erforschungen auf dem Gesammtgebiete der Geographie 14, pp. 290-94
- Carl Sandreczki (1871). "Briefe aus Palästina" [Letters from Palestine]. Das Ausland 44, p. 810
- Carl Sandreczki (1872). "Zur alten Geographie Palästinas" [On the ancient geography of Palestine]. Das Ausland 5, pp. 73-78, 97-103
- Carl Sandreczki (1874). "Wozu uns Deutsche der "Palestine Exploration Fund" ermahnt" [What the "Palestine Exploration Fund" prompts us Germans to do]. Das Ausland 47, pp. 114-15

== See also ==
- Christianity in Israel

== Bibliography ==
- Goren, Haim (2003). "Zieht hin und erforscht das Land": die deutsche Palästinaforschung im 19. Jahrhundert ["Go and explore the land": German Palestine exploration in the 19th century]. Monographs of the Institute for German History, Tel Aviv University, Volume 23 (in German). Translated by Antje Clara Naujoks. Göttingen: Wallstein Verlag. pp. 299f. ISBN 978-3-89244-673-6.
- Nissan, Shemuel; Martin, Petra (August 1998). "Max Sandreczky: A pediatric surgeon in 19th-century Jerusalem" (PDF). Journal of Pediatric Surgery. 33 (8): 1187–1193. doi:10.1016/S0022-3468(98)90148-8. PMID 9721984 – via Hebrew University website.
