= Felix Tretter =

Austrian psychotherapist and psychiatrist

- Born: 1949 (age 76–77); Villach
- Education: University of Vienna, Max-Planck Institute of Psychiatry, LMU Munich, Bavarian Academy for Addiction and Health Issues, Sigmund Freud University Vienna, Bertalanffy Center for the Study of Systems Science
- Scientific career
- Fields: Neuroscience, Psychology, Psychiatry, Neurology, medicine and Cybernetics

Felix Tretter (born in 1949 in Villach, Austria) is an Austrian psychologist and psychiatrist. From 1992 to 2014 he was head of the addiction department of the Isar-Amper-Klinikum München-Ost, formerly known as Bezirkskrankenhaus Haar, Bavaria, Germany. His scientific work has emphasis on modelling of psychophysical scenarios in schizophrenia and addiction research with methods of systems science.

== Biography ==
Felix Tretter graduated in philosophy, psychology, medicine, statistics, sociology, and economics at the universities of Vienna and Munich. Subsequently, he worked as a scholar at the Max-Planck Institute for Psychiatry in Munich. After earning doctorates as Dr. phil., Dr. med. and Dr. rer. pol. he habilitated to qualify as a professor in clinical psychology at LMU Munich. Additionally, he was for several years involved in the constitution of environmental medicine in Germany.

Board-certified for neurology, psychiatry, and psychotherapy he was appointed the head of the addiction department of the Bezirkskrankenhaus Haar, a tertiary psychiatric hospital in the east of Munich. He held this position up to his retirement in 2014.

Felix Tretter is deputy head of the Bavarian Academy for Addiction and Health Issues (Bayerische Akademie für Sucht- und Gesundheitsfragen). Since 2015 he is fellow at the Bertalanffy Center for the Study of Systems Science (BCSSS) in Vienna.

== Scientific work ==
Tretter wrote research papers, review articles, and books. The main focus of his scientific work is mathematical description of neuropsychological mechanisms in the evolution of schizophrenia and addiction. He aims at describing psychosocial problems from a perspective of cybernetics, systems and ecology. Additional publications by Tretter include systems biology and theory of medicine applied to different fields, including COVID-19.

== Selected publications ==
=== Books ===
- Tretter, F. Ökologie der Sucht. Hogrefe Verlag 1998. ISBN 3801710130
- Tretter, F. Systemtheorie im klinischen Kontext. Pabst, Lengerich 2005 ISBN 3899671821
- Tretter, F. Ökologie der Person. Pabst, Lengerich 2008, ISBN 9783899674323
- Tretter, F., Grünhut, C. Ist das Gehirn der Geist? Grundfragen der Neurophysiologie. Hogrefe, Göttingen, 2010. ISBN 3801722767
- Tretter, F. Sucht. Gehirn. Gesellschaft. Medizinisch Wissenchaftliche Verlagsgesellschaft, Berlin 2016. ISBN 9783954662906
- Tretter, F. (Editor) Suchtmedizin kompakt. Schattauer, Stuttgart 2008, 2012 und 2017. ISBN 9783794531622.
- Tretter, F., Winterer, G., (Editor), Gebicke-Haerter, P. J., Mendoza, E. R. (Editors) Systems Biology in Psychiatric Research: From High-Throughput Data to Mathematical Modeling. Wiley-Blackwell 2010 ISBN 978-3-527-32503-0

=== Selected research papers and review articles ===
- Bender, W; Albus, M; Möller, HJ; Tretter, F (Feb 2006). "Towards systemic theories in biological psychiatry". Pharmacopsychiatry. 39 (Suppl 1): S4–9. doi:10.1055/s-2006-931482. PMID 16508889. S2CID 14067786.
- Tretter, F; Scherer, J (Feb 2006). "Schizophrenia, neurobiology and the methodology of systemic modeling". Pharmacopsychiatry. 39 (Suppl 1): S26–35. doi:10.1055/s-2006-931486. PMID 16508893. S2CID 6052134.
- Tretter, F; Gebicke-Haerter, PJ; Albus, M; an der Heiden, U; Schwegler, H (May 2009). "Systems biology and addiction". Pharmacopsychiatry. 42 (Suppl 1): S11–31. doi:10.1055/s-0029-1220699. PMID 19434548. S2CID 260243208.
- Tretter, F; Gebicke-Haerter, PJ (May 2009). "Philosophy of neuroscience and options of systems science". Pharmacopsychiatry. 42 (Suppl 1): S2–S10. doi:10.1055/s-0029-1215598. PMID 19434553. S2CID 9314224.
- Tretter, F; Rujescu, D; Pogarell, O; Mendoza, E (May 2010). "Systems biology of the synapse". Pharmacopsychiatry. 43 (Suppl 1): S1. doi:10.1055/s-0030-1253386. PMID 20480443. S2CID 260243464.
- Tretter, F; Gebicke-Haerter, PJ; an der Heiden, U; Rujescu, D; Mewes, HW; Turck, CW (May 2011). "Affective disorders as complex dynamic diseases—a perspective from systems biology". Pharmacopsychiatry. 44 (Suppl 1): S2–8. doi:10.1055/s-0031-1275278. PMID 21544742. S2CID 20843235.
- Kotchoubey, B; Tretter, F; Braun, HA; Buchheim, T; Draguhn, A; Fuchs, T; Hasler, F; Hastedt, H; Hinterberger, T; Northoff, G; Rentschler, I; Schleim, S; Sellmaier, S; Tebartz Van, Elst L; Tschacher, W (Nov 2016). "Methodological Problems on the Way to Integrative Human Neuroscience". Front Integr Neurosci. 10: 41. doi:10.3389/fnint.2016.00041. PMC 5126073. PMID 27965548.
- Tretter, F; Scherer, J (Feb 2006). "Schizophrenia, neurobiology and the methodology of systemic modeling". Pharmacopsychiatry. 39 (Suppl 1): S26–35. doi:10.1055/s-2006-931486. PMID 16508893. S2CID 6052134.
- Tretter, F; Löffler-Stastka, H (Sep 2018). "Steps Toward an Integrative Clinical Systems Psychology". Front Psychol. 9: 1616. doi:10.3389/fpsyg.2018.01616. PMC 6157403. PMID 30283371.
- Qi, Z; Tretter, F; Voit, EO (Mar 2014). "A heuristic model of alcohol dependence". PLOS ONE. 9 (3) e92221. Bibcode:2014PLoSO...992221Q. doi:10.1371/journal.pone.0092221. PMC 3962390. PMID 24658530.
