= Caseous necrosis =

Form of cell death

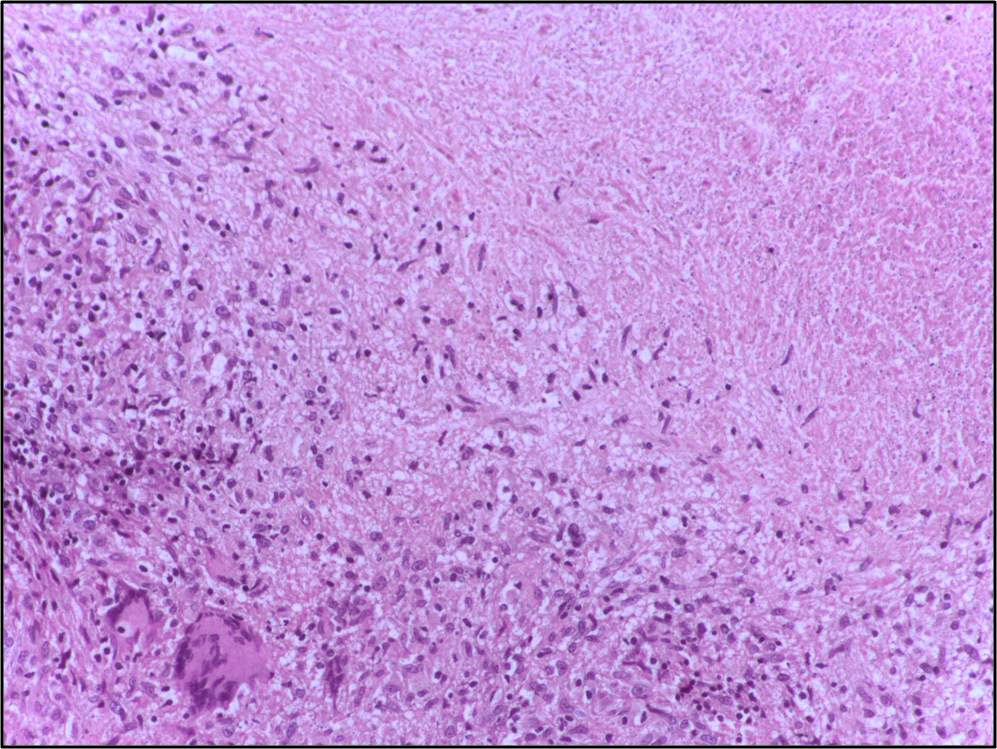
- Micrograph showing caseous necrosis of a tuberculous lymph node. H&E stain. Histological specimens are normally obtained from supraclavicular lymph nodes to demonstrate caseous necrosis.
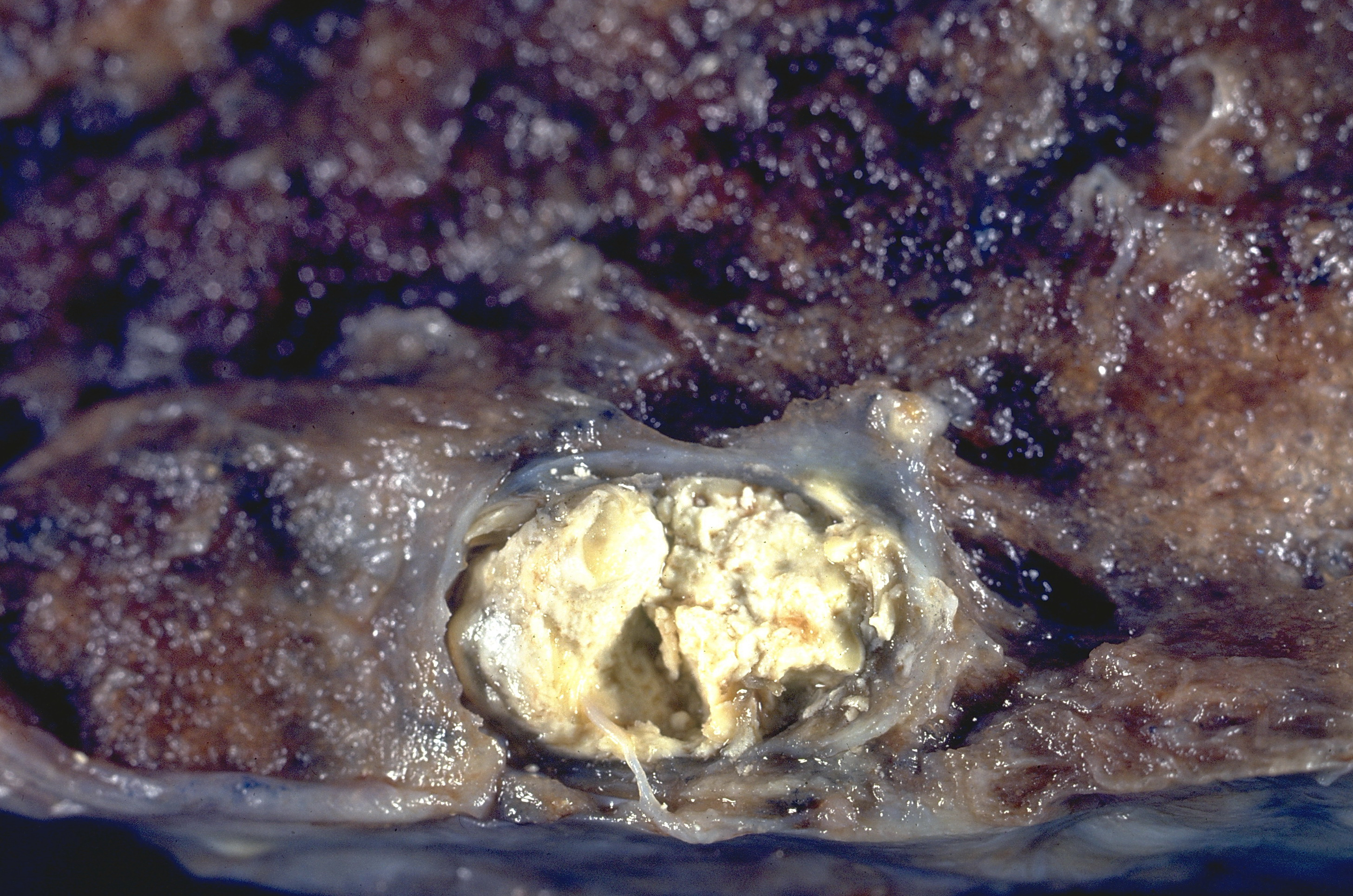
- Subpleural caseous necrosis (Ghon focus)
- Specialty: Pathology
- Complications: Lung cavity
- Causes: Tuberculosis

Caseous necrosis or caseous degeneration (/ˈkeɪsiəs/) is a unique form of cell death in which the tissue maintains a cheese-like appearance, appearing as a soft and white proteinaceous dead cell mass. The dead tissue is enclosed within a granuloma, and differs from coagulative necrosis in that tissue structure is destroyed. Caseous necrosis is most notably associated with tuberculoma.

The term caseous means 'pertaining or related to cheese', and comes from the Latin word caseus 'cheese'.

== Histology ==
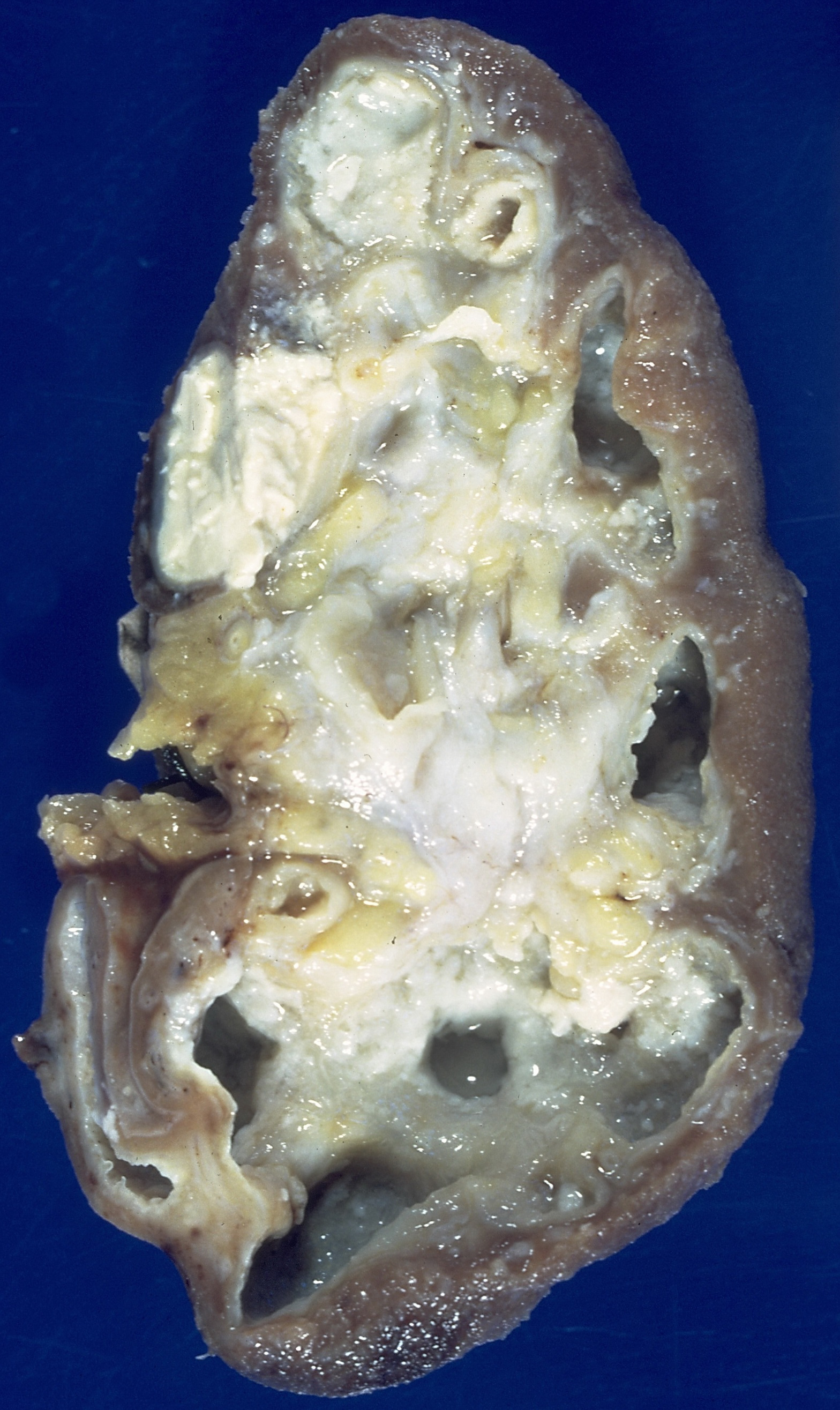
Caseous necrosis in the kidney

In caseous necrosis no histological architecture is preserved (unlike with coagulative necrosis). On microscopic examination with H&E staining, the area is acellular, characterised by amorphous, roughly granular eosinophilic debris of dead cells, also containing interspersed haematoxyphilic remnants of cell nucleus contents. This caseus necrotic center is enclosed within a granuloma.

== Causes ==
Caseous necrosis is characteristically associated with tuberculomas. A similar appearance can be associated with histoplasmosis, cryptococcosis, and coccidioidomycosis.

== Pathophysiology ==
The process begins as infection is recognized by the body and macrophages begin walling off the microorganisms or pathogens. As macrophages release chemicals that digest cells the cells begin to die. As the cells die they disintegrate but are not completely digested and the debris of the disintegrated cells clumps together creating soft granular mass that has the appearance of cheese. As cell death begins, the granuloma forms and cell death continues, the inflammatory response is mediated by a type IV hypersensitivity reaction.

Some data suggests that host macrophages associated with granulomas may prevent effective immune clearance of mycobacteria, due to their epithelioid morphology and associated barrier function.
