= Thomas Smolej =

Austrian actor and director

Thomas Smolej is an Austrian actor and director.

== Early life and education ==
Thomas Smolej grew up in Carinthia, completing high school in 2001 at BORG Klagenfurt with a concentration on music, and completed an acting degree at the Viennese Examination Board (Paritätische Prüfungskommission Wien). He studied voice with Ronald Pries at the Klagenfurt Conservatory.

Since 2002 Smolej has lived in Vienna. After moving there he took acting lessons with Erhard Pauer and Isabel Weicken, as well as voice with Christian Koch und Jack Poppell and speech training with Biggi Weidinger.

== Career ==
Since then he has worked as a freelance actor in stage productions, doing voiceovers for radio and TV, and as an acting coach and lecturer for speech technique ("Introduction to Theoretical and Practical Speech Technique", "Einführung in die theoretische und praktische Sprechtechnik") at the Theater-, Film- und Medienwissenschaft department of the University of Vienna.

Since 2005 Smolej has been a member of the permanent ensemble of Cabarat Simpl, has worked as a director, and has been on the Jury of the Examination Board for Equal Representation in the Stage Profession (Paritätischen Prüfungskommission für den Bühnenberuf) since 2012.

== Acting work (selection) ==
- Romeo und Julia (Tybalt and Lorenzo, Internationales Shakespeare-Festival Neuss. Director: Markus Steinwender)
- Wir sind noch einmal davongekommen (Telegraph boy, Gruppe 80, Vienna. Director: Erhard Pauer)
- Das Gespenst von Canterville (Cecil. Theatersommer Haag. Director: Werner Sobotka)
- Just So (Leopard. Theater der Jugend, Vienna. Director: Henry Mason)
- Aladdin (Aladdin tour, Thelen&Thelen Entertainment)
- Gustav Klimt (Musical) (Ernst Klimt. Premiere in Gutenstein. Director: Dean Welterlen)
- Cabaret Simpl: Welttag der Nudelsuppe, Zwischen allen Stühlen, Kein schöner Land, Ein großes Gwirks, Ich bin viele, Niederösterreichischer Theatersommer, 100 Jahre Simpl (Directors: Werner Sobotka, Hannes Muik, Dolores Schmidinger und Roman Frankl)

== Directing work (selection) ==
- Don Carlos 06 (adapted from Schiller, co-director with Pamela Schermann, Theater des Augenblicks)
- Trotz aller Therapie (Christopher Durang, Andino Vienna)
- Offene Zweierbeziehung (Dario Fo und Franca Rame, Sommerspiele Wolkersdorf)
- "Für immer in Jeans" - Peter Kraus Revue (European tour)
- "Kurzschluss" Susanna Hirschler (Cabaret, Metropol Vienna)
- "Leben für die Bühne" Dagmar Koller (Stage comeback show, Kammerspiele Vienna)
- Gretchen 89ff. (Lutz Hübner, co-director with Sascha O. Bauer, Alexander Kuchinka, Kulturhofkeller Villach)
- "Alles gelogen!" Elke Winkens (One-woman show, Eden Bar Vienna)

== Voiceover work (selection) ==
ZOOM – Children's exhibition, Österreichischer Rundfunk, Servus TV, McDonald's, Nissan, Sony, ÖAMTC, Dulcolax, Alpla, 3, T-Mobile, IKEA, Kurier (Tageszeitung), Schwarzkopf (Haarkosmetik), Schartner Bombe, NÖ-Card, Vereinigte Bühnen Wien.
