= Friedrich Heinrich Ranke =

German Protestant theologian (1798-1876)

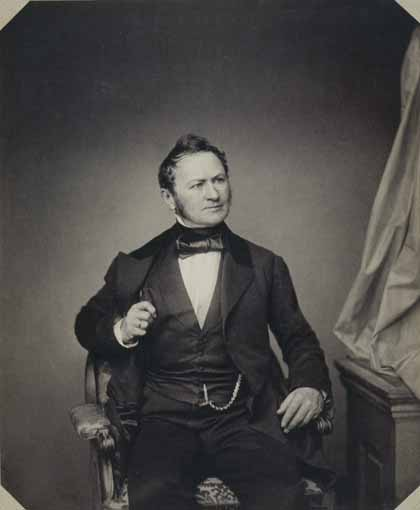
Friedrich Heinrich Ranke (ca. 1850)

Friedrich Heinrich Ranke (30 November 1798 – 2 September 1876) was a German Protestant theologian. He was the brother of historian Leopold von Ranke (1795–1886) and the father of pediatrician Heinrich von Ranke (1830-1909) and anthropologist Johannes Ranke (1836-1916).

He studied theology and philology at the University of Jena, where he was a pupil of Heinrich Luden and Johann Philipp Gabler. He then studied philosophy at the University of Halle (from 1817), afterwards working as a private schoolteacher in Frankfurt an der Oder. In 1826 he was named pastor in the town of Rückersdorf.

In 1834 he relocated to Thurnau as dean and senior pastor, and several years later was appointed professor of theology at the University of Erlangen as a successor to Hermann Olshausen (1840). In 1842 he was appointed Konsistorialrat in Bayreuth, followed by duties as Konsistorialrat and Hauptprediger in Ansbach. In 1866 he was appointed Oberconsistorialrat in Munich.

He wielded considerable influence towards the implementation of the Erweckungsbewegung (revivalist movement) in Bavaria. He also promoted the development of the Innere Mission, a German Protestant movement. Ranke was an opponent of theological rationalism.

== Published works ==
He was the author of lyrics to popular hymns, two of which are part of the present-day Evangelisches Gesangbuch (Protestant hymn book):

- 1820 Advent hymn, "Tochter Zion, freue dich" ("Daughter of Zion, rejoice", same music as "Thine Be the Glory", music by George Frideric Handel).
- 1823 Christmas carol, "Herbei, o ihr Gläubigen" (from the Latin "Adeste Fideles"; in English "O Come, All Ye Faithful"; music by John Francis Wade).

In 1832 he published a German edition of work by John Bunyan with the title of Des Christen Wallfahrt nach der himmlischen Stadt (introduction written by Gotthilf Heinrich von Schubert). He was also the author of a two volume study of the Pentateuch, titled Untersuchungen über den Pentateuch, aus dem Gebiete der hoeheren Kritik (volume 1, 1834; volume 2, 1840).
