= Johannes Ranke =

German physiologist and anthropologist

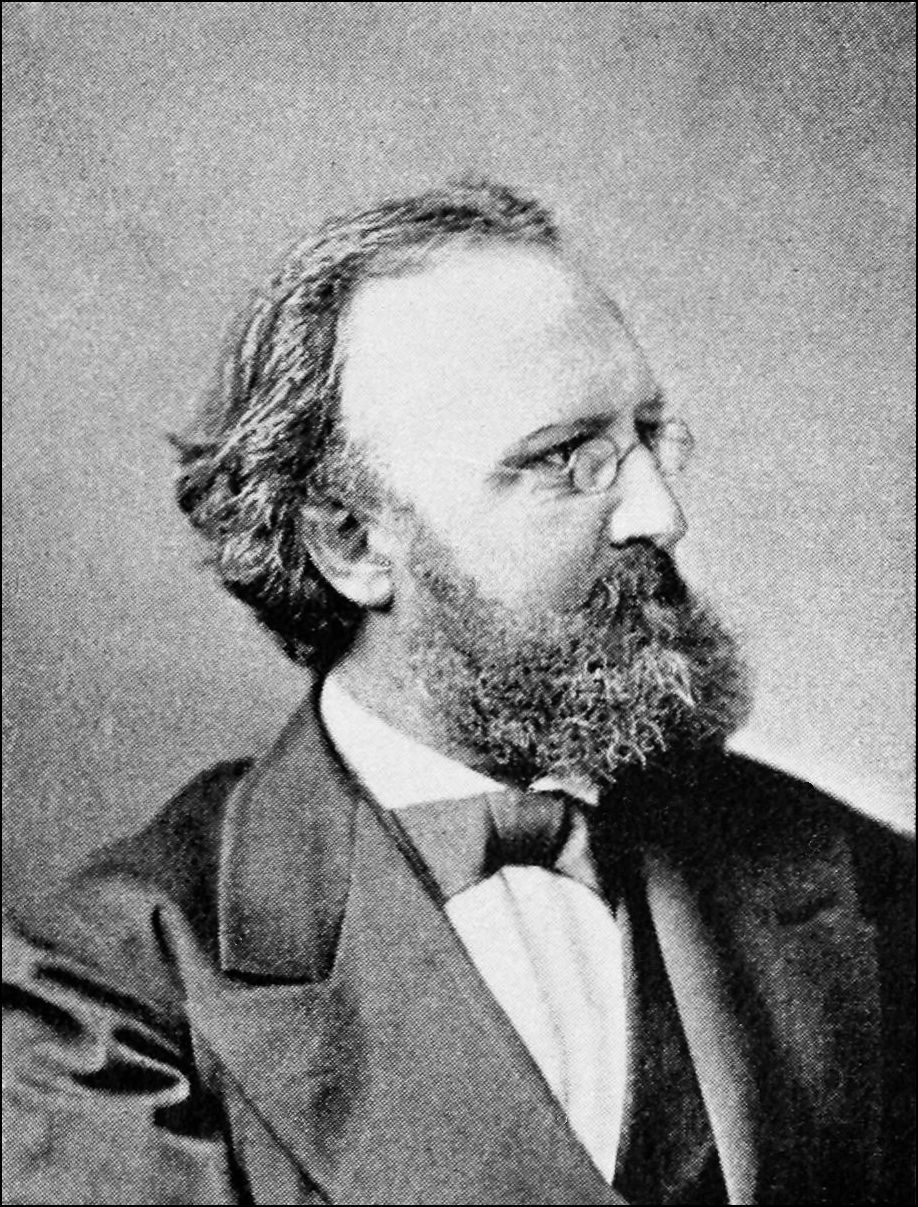
From Popular Science Monthly, May 1892

Johannes Ranke (23 August 1836, Thurnau – 26 July 1916, Munich) was a German physiologist and anthropologist. He was the son of theologian Friedrich Heinrich Ranke (1798–1876), the brother of pediatrician Heinrich von Ranke (1830–1909) and father to pulmonologist Karl Ernst Ranke (1870–1926).

== Biography ==
He studied medicine and natural sciences at the Ludwig-Maximilians-Universität München, the University of Tübingen, the Friedrich Wilhelm University of Berlin, and the University of Paris, receiving his medical doctorate from the Ludwig-Maximilians-Universität München in 1861. As a student, his influences included pathologist Rudolf Virchow and chemist Justus von Liebig. In 1863, he obtained his habilitation with the thesis, Galvanischen Leitungswiderstand des lebenden Muskels, and spent the following years conducting physiological studies on tetanus and human nutrition. In 1868, he published a textbook on human physiology, titled Grundzüge der Physiologie des Menschen.

As a lecturer at the anatomical-physiological institute at the Ludwig-Maximilians-Universität München, he gave lectures on anthropology and general natural history (1863–69). He became an associate professor on the latter subject in 1869. From 1876 onward, his interests dealt almost entirely with problems associated with prehistory and anthropology. He made numerous contributions in his research of the physical anthropology associated with prehistoric Bavaria, being especially interested in studies of human skull forms. From his anthropological research, he was opposed to the racial ideology theories espoused by Arthur de Gobineau and Houston Stewart Chamberlain. In 1886, he attained the first university chair of anthropology in all of Germany. In 1886–87 he published an acclaimed two-volume textbook on scientific anthropology, called Der Mensch.

He was editor of the Beiträge zur Anthropologie und Urgeschichte Bayerns, the Archiv für Anthropologie, and the Korrespondenzblatt of the Deutsche Gesellschaft für Anthropologie. In 1885, he created the "prehistoric division" within the Paläontologischen Sammlung des Staates; in 1889 the prehistoric collection had become an independent entity.

== Associated eponym ==
- "Ranke angle": The angle formed by the horizontal plane of the head and a line passing from the centre of the margin of the alveolar arch of the maxilla, below the nasal spine to the centre of the frontonasal suture.
