= Heinrich von Ranke =

German physiologist and pediatrician (1830-1909)

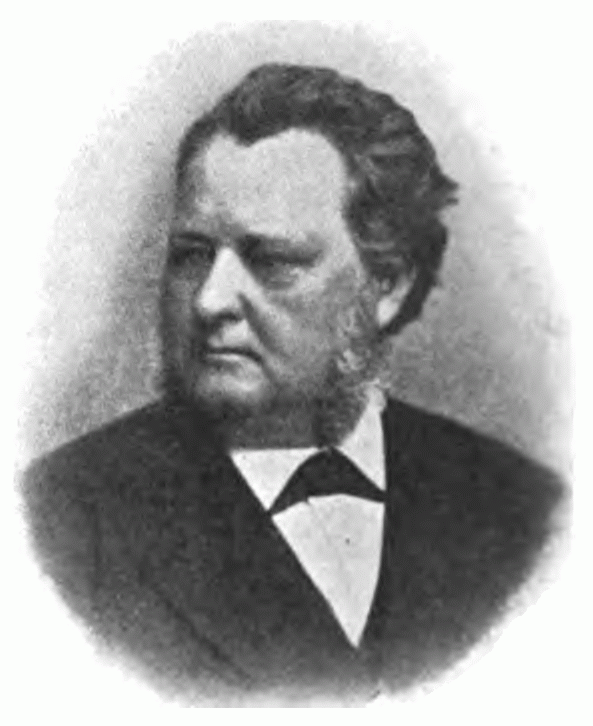
Heinrich von Ranke (1830–1909)

Heinrich von Ranke (8 May 1830, Rückersdorf – 13 May 1909, Munich) was a German physiologist and pediatrician. He was the son of theologian Friedrich Heinrich Ranke (1798-1876) and the brother of anthropologist Johannes Ranke (1836-1916). Famed historian Leopold von Ranke (1795-1886) was his uncle.

== Biography ==
Ranke studied at the Friedrich Wilhelm University of Berlin, Leipzig University, the University of Erlangen, and the University of Tübingen. At the University of Erlangen, he was a student of the chemist Eugen von Gorup-Besánez, and at the Friedrich Wilhelm University of Berlin, he was an assistant to physiologist Johannes Peter Müller (1849–1850). In 1851, he obtained his doctorate with a dissertation involving physiological-chemical studies on the behaviour of some organic substances in humans.

From 1853 to 1858, he was associated with the German Hospital in London, during which time, he also served as a civilian physician in the service of the British government in Smyrna and in the Crimea (1855–1856). In 1859, he received his habilitation at the Ludwig-Maximilians-Universität München, becoming an honorary professor in 1863. In 1866, he was appointed director of the children's polyclinic at the Reisingerianum in Munich. Here he worked together with Max Sandreczky who became his assistant, and probably influenced Sandreczky's decision to dedicate his career to the care of children. In 1874 Ranke became an associate professor, and in 1886, was named as director of Hauner's Kinderspital at the university.

== Published works ==
- Physiologisch-chemische Untersuchungen über das Verhalten einiger organischer Stoffe im menschlichen Organismus nebst Versuchen über die diuretische Wirkung mehrerer Arzneimittel, 1851 – Physiological-chemical studies on the behavior of some organic substances in the human organism, along with experiments on the diuretic effect of several drugs.
- Acht Tage bei unseren Verwundeten in den entlegeneren Spitälern, 1866.
- Studien zur Wirkung des Chloroforms, Aethers, Amylens, 1867 – Studies on the effects of chloroform, ether and amylene.
- Cholera-Infections-Versuche an weissen Mäusen, 1874 – Cholera infection experiments on white mice.
- Experimenteller Beweis der Möglichkeit der Selbstentzündung des Heues (Liebig's Annalen CLXVII), – Experimental evidence of the possibility of spontaneous combustion of hay.
- Zur Aetiologie der Spina bifida, 1878 – The aetiology of spina bifida.
- Zur Münchener Canalisationsfrage, 1879.

== See also ==
- Max Sandreczky
