= Biocybernetics =

Application of cybernetics to biological science disciplines

Biocybernetics is the application of cybernetics to biological science disciplines such as neurology and multicellular systems. Biocybernetics plays a major role in systems biology, seeking to integrate different levels of information to understand how biological systems function. The field of cybernetics itself has origins in biological disciplines such as neurophysiology. Biocybernetics is an abstract science and is a fundamental part of theoretical biology, based upon the principles of systemics. Biocybernetics is a psychological study that aims to understand how the human body functions as a biological system and performs complex mental functions like thought processing, motion, and maintaining homeostasis. Within this field, many distinct qualities allow for different distinctions within the cybernetic groups such as humans and insects such as beehives and ants.

Humans work together but they also have individual thoughts that allow them to act on their own, while worker bees follow the commands of the queen bee. Although humans often work together, they can also separate from the group and think for themselves. A unique example of this within the human sector of biocybernetics would be in society during the colonization period, when Great Britain established their colonies in North America and Australia. Many of the traits and qualities of the mother country were inherited by the colonies, as well as niche qualities that were unique to them based on their areas like language and personality—similar vines and grasses, where the parent plant produces offshoots, spreading from the core. Once the shoots grow their roots and get separated from the mother plant, they will survive independently and be considered their plant. Society is more closely related to plants than to animals since, like plants, there is no distinct separation between parent and offspring. The branching of society is more similar to plant reproduction than to animal reproduction. Humans are a K-selected species that typically have fewer offspring that they nurture for longer periods than r-selected species. It could be argued that when Britain created colonies in regions like North America and Australia, these colonies, once they became independent, should be seen as offspring of British society. Like all children, the colonies inherited many characteristics, such as language, customs and technologies, from their parents, but still developed their own personality. This form of reproduction is most similar to the type of vegetative reproduction used by many plants, such as vines and grasses, where the parent plant produces offshoots, spreading ever further from the core. When such a shoot, once it has produced its own roots, gets separated from the mother plant, it will survive independently and define a new plant. Thus, the growth of society is more like that of plants than like that of the higher animals that we are most familiar with, there is not a clear distinction between a parent and its offspring.

Superorganisms are also capable of the so-called "distributed intelligence," a system composed of individual agents with limited intelligence and information. These can pool resources to complete goals beyond the individuals' reach on their own. Similar to the concept of "Game theory." In this concept, individuals and organisms make choices based on the behaviors of the other player to deem the most profitable outcome for them as an individual rather than a group.

== Terminology ==
Biocybernetics is a conjoined word from bio (Greek: βίο / life) and cybernetics (Greek: κυβερνητική / controlling-governing). Although the extended form of the word is biological cybernetics, the field is most commonly referred to as biocybernetics in scientific papers.

== Subfields and Methods ==
- Connectionism
- Biological Information Theory
- Systems Biology

== Early proponents ==
Early proponents of biocybernetics include Ross Ashby, Hans Drischel, and Norbert Wiener among others. Popular papers published by each scientist are listed below.

Ross Ashby, "Introduction to Cybernetics", 1956
Hans Drischel, "Einführung in die Biokybernetik." 1972
Norbert Wiener, "Cybernetics or Control and Communication in the Animal and the Machine", 1948

== Similar fields ==
Papers and research that delve into topics involving biocybernetics may be found under a multitude of similar names, including molecular cybernetics, neurocybernetics, and cellular cybernetics. Such fields involve disciplines that specify certain aspects of the study of the living organism (for example, neurocybernetics focuses on the study neurological models in organisms).

== Categories ==
- Biocybernetics – the study of an entire living organism
- Neurocybernetics – cybernetics dealing with neurological models. (Psycho-Cybernetics was the title of a self-help book, and is not a scientific discipline)
- Molecular cybernetics – cybernetics dealing with molecular systems (e.g. molecular biology cybernetics)
- Cellular cybernetics – cybernetics dealing with cellular systems (e.g. information technology/cell phones or biological cells)
- Evolutionary cybernetics – study of the evolution of informational systems (See also evolutionary programming, evolutionary algorithm)

== See also ==
- Bioinformatics
- Biosemiotics
- Computational biology
- Computational biomodeling
- Medical cybernetics
- List of biomedical cybernetics software
