= Ghon focus =

Feature of tuberculosis seen in chest X-ray

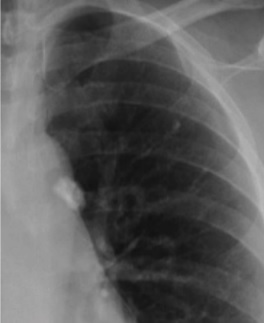
Chest X-ray of a Ghon's focus

A Ghon focus is a primary lesion usually subpleural, often in the mid to lower zones, caused by Mycobacterium bacilli (tuberculosis) developed in the lung of a nonimmune host (usually a child). It is named for Anton Ghon (1866–1936), an Austrian pathologist.

It is a small area of granulomatous inflammation, only detectable by chest X-ray if it calcifies or grows substantially (see tuberculosis radiology). Typically these will heal, but in some cases, especially in immunosuppressed patients, it will progress to miliary tuberculosis (so named due to the granulomas resembling millet seeds on a chest X-ray).

The classical location for primary infection is surrounding the lobar fissures, either in the upper part of the lower lobe or lower part of the upper lobe.

If the Ghon focus also involves infection of adjacent lymphatics and hilar lymph nodes, it is known as the Ghon's complex or primary complex. When a Ghon's complex undergoes fibrosis and calcification it is called a Ranke complex.
