= Nazar (given name) =

- Gender: male

Origin
- Region of origin: worldwide

Nazar is a masculine given name of multiple origins. Notable people with the name include:

== Given name ==
- Nazar (comedian) (died 1992), Pakistani comedian and actor
- Nazar (musician) (born 1993), Angolan musician
- Nazar (rapper) (born 1984), Austrian rapper
- Nazar Shah Alam (born 1989), Indonesian singer
- Nazar Albaryan (1943–2021), Armenian wrestler
- Nazar Ashraf (born 1953), Iraqi football player and coach
- Nazar Al Baharna (born 1950), Bahraini academic, entrepreneur, and politician
- Nazar Baýramow (born 1982), Turkmen footballer
- Nazar Begliyev (born 1980), Turkmen middle-distance runner
- Nazar Bolot uulu (died 1893), Kyrgyz poet
- Nazar Chepurnyi (born 2002), Ukrainian gymnast
- Nazar Domchak (born 2007), Ukrainian footballer
- Nazar Firman (born 1983), Ukrainian chess grandmaster
- Nazar Ghazali (born 1984), Iraqi bodybuilder
- Nazar Muhammad Gondal (born 1950), Pakistani politician
- Nazar ul Hassan (born 1985), Pakistani actor
- Nazar Hussain (born 1988), Pakistani cricketer
- Nazar-ul-Islam (1939–1994), Pakistani film director
- Nazar Kadir (born 1966), Iraqi weightlifter
- Nazar Kholodnytskyi (born 1985), Ukrainian prosecutor
- Nazar Hussain Kiyani (1932–2008), Pakistani politician
- Nazar Kmit (born 1993), Ukrainian footballer
- Nazar Kovalenko (born 1987), Ukrainian racewalker
- Nazar Kulchytskyy (born 1992), Ukrainian-American wrestler and coach
- Nazar Louginets (born 1989), Russian sport shooter
- Nazar Lytvyn (born 1983), Ukrainian footballer
- Nazar Malinovskyi (born 1998), Ukrainian footballer
- Nazar Milishchuk (born 1986), Ukrainian footballer
- Nazar Mohammad (1921–1996), Pakistani cricketer
- Nazar Mohammad (Afghan communist) (1935–1998), Afghan Army officer
- Nazar Mohammad Mutmaeen (born 1973), Afghan writer, journalist, and political analyst
- Nazar Najarian (1957–2020), Lebanese businessman and politician
- Nazar Nebozhynskyi (1999–2022), Ukrainian athlete and war hero
- Nazar Nurzaidin (born 1995), Indonesian footballer
- Nazar Parnitskyi (born 2006), Ukrainian speedway rider
- Nazar Penkovets (born 1987), Ukrainian footballer
- Nazar Petrosyan (born 1951), Russian football coach and player
- Nazar Privalov (born 2009), Russian ice hockey player
- Nazar Prykhodko (born 2001), Ukrainian footballer
- Nazar-ur-Rehman (1929–2026), Pakistani Islamic preacher
- Nazar Aqa Yamin ol-Saltaneh (1817–??), Iranian diplomat
- Nazar Ali Khan Shahsevan (1735–1792), Khan of Ardabil
- Nazar Soýunow (1936–2021), Turkmen politician
- Nazar Stasyshyn (born 1997), Ukrainian footballer
- Nazar Verbnyi (born 1997), Ukrainian footballer
- Nazar Voloshyn (born 2003), Ukrainian footballer
- Nazar Voloshyn (footballer, born 2000) (born 2000), Ukrainian footballer
- Nazar Vyzdryk (born 1996), Ukrainian footballer
- Nazar Yahya (born 1963), Iraqi-American artist
- Nazar Yeroshenko (born 2003), Ukrainian footballer
- Nazar Abdul Zahra (1961–2006), Iraqi footballer

== Fictional characters ==
- Zoya Nazar, fictional character in the Indian YRF Spy Universe, portrayed by Katrina Kaif
- Rehan Nazar Jung, fictional ISI agent and father of Zoya in the YRF Spy Universe

== See also ==
- Nazarov
