= Rivne (disambiguation) =

Rivne is the capital of Rivne Oblast, Ukraine.

Rivne may also refer to:

- Rivne Oblast, Ukraine
- Rivne, Lviv Oblast, a village in Lviv Oblast, Ukraine
- Rivne International Airport in Rivne
- RC Rivne, a rugby club in Rivne

== See also ==
- Rovné, Svidník District, a village in Slovakia
