= Wladimir Wertelecki =

Wladimir Wertelecki
Born	(1936) In Rivne, Volyn, Ukraine (at the time Poland)
Citizenship	USA
Fields	Clinical Teratology, Genetics and Pediatrics
Education	National San Fernando Highschool, Buenos Aires, Argentina
Mentors	Taras Mykysha, Volodymyr Lasovskyi, Bernardo Houssay, Niсeto S. Loizaga, M.D., Alexis Hartmann, Harold Cummins, PhD., Josef Warkany, Daniel C. Gajdusek, John Gofman
Alma mater	Medical School, University of Buenos Aires, Argentina (1956–1961)
Postgraduate	Intern, Muniz Hospital, Buenos Aires, Argentina (1961 - 1962). Intern, Deaconess Hospital, St. Louis, MO, U.S. (1963). Resident in Pediatrics, St. Louis Children's Hospital and Washington University Medical School, St. Louis, MO (1964 - 1966). Fellow in Clinical Genetics, Boston Children's Hospital and Harvard Medical School, Boston, MA (1966 - 1968)
Academic Posts and Tenures	Instructor, Pediatrics, Boston Children's Hospital and Harvard Medical School, Boston, MA (1968–1969). Senior Surgeon, U.S. Public Health Commissioned Corps., Epidemiology Branch, National Cancer Institute, Bethesda, MD (1969–1972). Assistant Professor, Pediatrics, Medical University of South Carolina, Charleston, SC (1972). Associate Professor, Pediatrics and Pathology, Medical University of South Carolina, Charleston, SC (1973–1974). Professor and chairman, Department of Medical Genetics, University of South Alabama, Mobile, AL (1974–2010). Professor Emeritus, University of South Alabama, Mobile, AL (2010-). Director, OMNI-Net Ukraine, Birth Defects Monitoring Programs (1999-)
Awards and Honors	Corresponding Member of the "Academia Nacional de Medicina" (Buenos Aires, Argentina) and Foreign Member of the National Academy of Sciences (Kyiv, Ukraine), Doctor Honoris Causa, National University of Kyiv-Mohyla Academy (Kyiv, Ukraine) and Lviv Medical University (Lviv, Ukraine)
Current	Director of OMNI-Net Programs in Ukraine. International Coordinator of CIFASD investigations in Ukraine. Investigations of teratogenesis of Chornobyl radionuclides.

Wladimir Wertelecki is a board certified pediatrician, clinical geneticist and cytogeneticist. In 1974, he established one of the first free-standing Departments of Medical Genetics at the University of South Alabama College of Medicine in Mobile, Alabama, U.S.A. Following his retirement as chairman and emeritus professor of Medical Genetics, Pediatrics, and Pathology, he continued his investigations into the prevention of developmental anomalies as a Project Scientist at the Department of Pediatrics, University of California, San Diego. Since 1996, his research has focused mainly on alcohol and the impact of ionizing radiation on congenital anomalies. He is the author over 147 scientific reports.

He established a regional network of clinics across southern Alabama and West Florida, and in 1978 he organized the Southern Genetic Group. This group expanded into the South-Eastern Regional Genetics Group, to enhance regional genetic services. Components of this network provided templates for the population-based surveillance system implemented later in Chornobyl-impacted regions in Ukraine. Wertelecki also helped local Native-Americans gain Federal Recognition in Alabama.

In 1992, he made a presentation to the US Senate regarding the reproductive risks posed by Chornobyl radiation. In 1999, following an initial sponsorship by USAID, he established the OMNI-Net program, a not-for-profit network, to investigate the reproductive risks posed by exposure to alcohol and ionizing radiation from Chornobyl. Wertelecki is the International Cooordinator of the OMNI-Net programs. OMNI-Net conducts population-based birth defects surveillance, is a full member of EUROCAT and ICBDSR, trains clinicians and provides medical assistance. Wertelecki is the editor of several internet sites related to OMNI-Net. Wertelecki also is the author of articles, related to history and overviews of Human Teratology and other subjects.

== Medical and postgraduate education and clinical training ==
Wertelecki began his medical education in 1955 at the School of Medicine of the University of Buenos Aires. As a medical student, he took additional courses to qualify as a teaching assistant in Human Anatomy (1957) and in physiology (1958).

These extracurricular courses proved to be formative. In anatomy, he observed an instance of anatomic atavism ("maneus muscle") which stimulated his interest in anatomical variants, anomalies, and evolution. His interest in physiology enabled him to join a research team headed by Dr. Virgilio G. Foglia, and coordinated by Dr. Bernardo Houssay, a Nobel Prize winner regarding diabetes mellitus impact on reproduction. As a student of clinical medicine, Wertelecki was granted a university scholarship and became an assistant to Dr. Niceto S. Loizaga, an expert in semiology and zoonosis (skills to recognize signs as signals of syndromes and diagnoses) (1958–1961). Next, Wertelecki completed a rotating internship at Deaconess Hospital, Saint Louis (1962–1963) and became a pediatric resident (1963–1965) at the Department of Pediatrics, St. Louis Children's Hospital and Washington University in St. Louis headed by Dr. Alexis F. Hartmann, one of the first to use insulin to treat diabetic children. Wertelecki's sought further training in Clinical Genetics as a fellow at the Boston Children's Hospital and Harvard Medical School (1965–1968). His tasks included participation in the Phenylketonuria Treatment Clinic and the development of computer-aided programs to gather family reproductive histories.

== Initial investigations of clinical patterns ==
During 1968–1970, Wertelecki studied Clinical Epidemiology while serving as a Senior Surgeon (Commander) of the US Public Health Corp at the Epidemiology Branch of the National Cancer Institute and consultant in Medical Genetics at the Naval National Medical Center in Bethesda, Maryland. In 1973, access to computerized medical records permitted a large epidemiologic analysis of epileptic women elevated risks to deliver children with facial clefts attributed to anti-epileptic therapies later confirmed to include such agent as “Dilantin” (phenytoin), described as fetal hydantoin syndrome in 1975. Anti-epileptic medications often reduced available folates to developing embryos was suspect of being teratogenic. Fifteen years later (1988) mandatory folic acid fortification of cereal/grain products was introduced to reduce prevalence if spina bifida. Analyses of birthweight and dermatoglyphic patterns of fingers and palms of leukemic children revealed statistically significant contrast indicative of prenatal factors, subsequently amply confirmed. The mentors and associates of these investigations included Mr. Nathan Mantel, Dr. Robert W. Miller, Dr. C.C. Plato, and Dr. Josef Warkany. Their collective contribution accepted notion of the association of congenital anomalies and factors with pediatric neoplasias. This association is evident following in utero exposures to ionizing radiation. Wertelecki often relied on his expertise in clinical semiology to report early clinical observations. The first clinical scientific report by Wertelecki as a junior resident of pediatrics concerned the recognition of cantharidin-related nephritis in children linked with blister beetles. As a research fellow of Medical Genetics and instructor of Pediatrics Wertelecki reported stigmatic signs for the recognition of rare and novel syndrome of a partial monosomy (deletion) of a segment of chromosome 18. At the time such deletions were considered lethal. He also reported results of early treatments of phenylketonuria. Recognition of triploidy was synthesized by Wertelecki, his students and colleagues. Another early synthesis of perhaps the first human observations of a disorder known in cattle its molecular characteristics was named dermatosparaxis, a collagen disorder. Studies of population isolates led to identifications of novel gene mutations and their clinical manifestations. Investigations of an isolate of a Native American population identified a gene mutation manifested as the Marinesco-Sjögren syndrome. The investigations expanded clinical spectrum of the disorder. Also facilitated the Federal recognition of a population as an Indian tribe. Another investigation of a different population isolate led to the identification of the gene mutation manifested as acoustic neuromas, spinal tumors, and other neoplasias. The studies led to the current notions of Neurofibromatosis type II and discovery of the crucial tumor suppressor protein known as Merlin protein.

== Academic teaching and research ==
As a professor and, eventually, chairman of a novel Department of Medical Genetics, Wertelecki recruited as visiting professors Drs J. Warkany, founder of a Teratology Society, and Dr. H. Zellweger, a pioneer of Pediatric Neurology. They contributed to the full range of programs sponsored by the department. The department was the prime organizer of the Southeastern Regional Genetics Group dedicated to coordinating regional resources and clinical services along with initiatives to promote computer-driven data collection of genetic services. His department became an accredited site for training physicians in Clinical Genetics and Clinical Cytogenetics. In addition to U.S. graduates, international trainees included those from Japan, Argentina, Brazil, Sri Lanka, China, India, among others.

Following the 1986 Chornobyl disaster Wertelecki organized a workshop during the 1991 International Congress of Human Genetics with a focus upon the potential teratogenic impacts of Chornobyl radionuclides on human embryos. In 1992, Wertelecki was invited to address a U.S. Senate Committee regarding Chornobyl and child health. In 1996, he received a grant from the National Institute of Child Health and Human Development to organize a Symposium during the Human Genetics International Congress of 1996 on the subject of Chornobyl radiation impacts on child development. The participating International experts, including those from Belarus and Ukraine, defined areas of concern and potential investigations. Wertelecki sought further advice from John William Gofman (Professor Emeritus of Molecular and Cell Biology at University of California at Berkeley), Daniel Carleton Gajdusek (Pediatrician winner of the Nobel Prize for the discovery of the human prion disease), Jennifer L Howse (President of the March of Dimes Foundation), Mike Katz (vice-president for Science, March of Dimes Foundation), and Godfrey Oakley(Director of the Division of Birth Defects of the U.S. Centers for Disease Control and Prevention), among others.

== Chornobyl - Ukraine ==
In 1999, a plan to establish a population based monitoring of birth defects upholding international standards in several regions of Ukraine was submitted and approved by the Ukrainian Ministry of Health, Wertelecki accepted to be the director of the project now referred to as OMNI-Net Ukraine Programs. In 2000, with initial support from the USAID, population surveillance of birth defects monitoring was initiated. In 2002, OMNI-Net data documented a high frequency of spina bifida, which persists to the present. Since then, OMNI-Net members advocate for the introduction of mandatory fortification of flour with folic acid to reduce spina bifida and related disorders by at least 50%.

In 2006, OMNI-Net qualified for full membership of the European birth defects monitoring network (EUROCAT) and became a participant in the Collaborative Initiative of Fetal Alcohol Spectrum Consortium (CIFASD). The results indicate that pregnant women residing in Polissia region of Rivne province which were polluted by Chornobyl radionuclides had statistically significantly higher incorporated Cs-137 radionuclides compared to those residing in not-Polissia concurrently with population-based rates of developmental anomalies also statistically significantly higher in Polissia than in not-Polissia. This cause-effect association is considered by OMNI-Net partners, led by Wertelecki, to be proven. However, they consider prudent that it must be promptly confirmed to be followed by Public Health policies to reduce to zero in-utero exposures to Chornobyl radionuclides and other sources of ionizing radiation.

During 2008 OMNI-Net joined the CIFASD network and Wertelecki accepted to be the International Coordinator of implementations in Ukraine under the direction of Dr. Christina Chambers Project Director, Department of Pediatrics, UCSD. The aim of the implementations is to define prenatal exposures to alcohol in large cohort and controls of exposed embryos and postnatal developmental parameters. The program is ongoing.

== Honors and awards ==
Amond others:

- 1988 SERGG South-Eastern Regional Genetics Group (Recognition).
- 1989 Humanitarian Award, Mobile Association for Retarded Citizens.
- 1992 Foreign Corresponding Member of Academy of Medicine, Buenos Aires, Argentina.
- 1998 Honorary Professor, Kharkov State University, School of Medicine.
- 1998 Distinguished Service Award, American Dermatoglyphics Association.
- 1999 Franklin Smith Award for Distinguished Service, State of Alabama.
- 2003 Foreign Member of the National Academy of Sciences, Ukraine.
- 2003 Doctor Honoris Causa, National University of Kyiv-Mohyla Academy, Ukraine.
- 2010 Doctor Honoris Causa, Lviv Medical University, Ukraine.
- 2016 Distinguished Service Award by the University of South Alabama Medical Alumni Association.

== Organizations ==
Among others, past and current:

- American College of Medical Genetics and Genomics
- American Society of Pediatrics and Pediatric Research (Emeritus)
- American Academy of Pediatrics
- The Teratology Society
- Academia Nacional de Medicina (Argentina)
- National Academy of Sciences of Ukraine
- American Public Health Association

== Selected scientific publications ==
(among others, for complete bibliography please see PubMed)

=== Selected early publications ===
- Foglia, V.G., Fernandez-Collazo, E.L., Wesley, O.R., Wertelecki, W., Granillo, R.: Trastornos de la Reproduccion de La Rata Macho Diabetica. Rev. Soc. Argent. Biol. 37:127 (1961).
- Wertelecki, W; Schindler, A.M; Gerald, P.S (1966). "Partial Deletion of Chromosome 18". The Lancet. 288 (7464): 641. doi:10.1016/S0140-6736(66)91964-7.
- Kennedy Jr, J. L; Wertelecki, W; Gates, L; Sperry, B. P; Cass, V. M (1967). "The early treatment of phenylketonuria". American Journal of Diseases of Children. 113 (1): 16–21. doi:10.1001/archpedi.1967.02090160066004. PMID 6016173.
- Wertelecki, W., Lawton, T.J.: A Computer Program for Gathering Family History. Eighth IBM Medical Symposium, p. 165 (1967).
- Wertelecki, W; Mantel, N (1973). "Increased Birth Weight in Leukemia". Pediatric Research. 7 (3): 132–8. doi:10.1203/00006450-197303000-00005. PMID 4511339.
- Niswander, J. D; Wertelecki, W (1973). "Congenital malformation among offspring of epileptic women". Lancet. 1 (7811): 1062. doi:10.1016/s0140-6736(73)90699-5. PMID 4122140.
- Wertelecki, W; Graham Jr, J. M; Sergovich, F. R (1976). "The clinical syndrome of triploidy". Obstetrics and Gynecology. 47 (1): 69–76. PMID 1246396.
- Wertelecki, W; Superneau, D. W; Blackburn, W. R; Varakis, J. N (1982). "Neurofibromatosis, skin hemangiomas, and arterial disease". Birth Defects Original Article Series. 18 (3B): 29–41. PMID 6814548.
- Wertelecki, Wladimir; Rouleau, Guy A; Superneau, Duane W; Forehand, Lois W; Williams, John P; Haines, Jonathan L; Gusella, James F (1988). "Neurofibromatosis 2: Clinical and DNA Linkage Studies of a Large Kindred". New England Journal of Medicine. 319 (5): 278–83. doi:10.1056/NEJM198808043190505. PMID 3134615.
- Wertelecki, Wladimir; Smith, Lynne T; Byers, Peter (1992). "Initial observations of human dermatosparaxis: Ehlers-Danlos syndrome type VIIC". The Journal of Pediatrics. 121 (4): 558–64. doi:10.1016/S0022-3476(05)81144-8. PMID 1403389.

=== Selected scientific publications post Chornobyl ===
- Yuskiv, N; Polishchuk, S; Shevchuk, S; Sosynyuk, Z; Vihovska, T; Yevtushok, L; Andelin, C; Oakley, G; Wertelecki, W (2004). "High Rates of Neural Tube Defects in Ukraine". Birth Defects Research, Part A. 70 (6): 400–402. doi:10.1002/bdra.20020. PMID 15211709.
- Wertelecki, W; Baryliak, I; Maslij, Ya; Dumanowska, M; Wolowyna, O; Yevtushok, L; Yevchuk, N; Shevchuk, O (2004). "Register of Newborns is Essential Resource for Regional Medical Demographic Analysis". Perinatology and Pediatrics Journal (2): 58–61.
- Wertelecki, W (2006). "Birth Defects Surveillance in Ukraine - A Process". Journal of Applied Genetics. 47 (2): 143–149. doi:10.1007/BF03194614. PMID 16682756.
- Wertelecki, W (2010). "Malformations in a chornobyl-impacted region". Pediatrics. 125 (4): 836–843. doi:10.1542/peds.2009-2219. PMID 20308207.
- Dancause, KN; Yevtushok, L; Lapchenko, S; Shumlyansky, I; Shevchenko, I; Wertelecki, W; Garruto, RM (2010). "Chronic radiation exposure in the Rivne-Polissia region of Ukraine: implications for birth defects". American Journal of Human Biology. 22 (5): 667–674. doi:10.1002/ajhb.21063. PMID 20737614.
- Wertelecki, W; Chambers, CD; Yevtushok, L; Zymak-Zakutnya, N; Sosyniuk, Z; Lapchenko, S; Ievtushok, B; Akhmedzhanova, D; Komov, O (2017). "Chornobyl 30 years later: Radiation, pregnancies, and developmental anomalies in Rivne, Ukraine". Eur J Med Genet. 60 (1): 2–11. doi:10.1016/j.ejmg.2016.09.019. PMID 27697599.
- Wertelecki, W (2021). "Chornobyl radiation-congenital anomalies: A persisting dilemma". Congenit Anom (Kyoto). 61 (1): 9–13. doi:10.1111/cga.12388. PMID 33405251.
- Morris, JK; Addor, MC; Ballardini, E; Barisic, I; Barrachina-Bonet, S; Braz, P; Cavero-Carbonell, C; Sipek, A Jr; Stevens, S; Tucker, D; Verellen-Dumoulin, C; de Walle, HEC; Wellesley, D; Wertelecki, W; Bermejo-Sanchez, E (2021). "Prevention of Neural Tube Defects in Europe: A Public Health Failure". Front Pediatr. 24 (9). doi:10.3389/fped.2021.647038. PMC 8264257. PMID 34249803.

=== Books, chapters and other publications (partial list) ===
1. Wertelecki, W., Lawton, T., Gerald, P.S.: Computer-Based Patient Interviewing. In: Computer-Assisted Instruction in the Health Professions. Eds., Stolurow, L.M., Peterson, T.I., Cunningham, A.C., Entelek, Inc., Newburyport, MA (1970).
2. Wertelecki, W., Peterson, R.D.A.: Primary Immunodeficiency Syndromes. In: Surgical Immunology. Ed., Munster, A.M., Grune Publishers, New York, NY (1976).
3. Wertelecki, W.: Regional Rural Genetics Program: Educational Considerations. In: The Management of Genetic Disorders. Eds., Bartsocas, C.S., Papadatos, C., Alan R. Liss Publishers, New York, NY (1979).
4. Wertelecki, W., Plato, C., Editors: Dermatoglyphics – 50 Years Later. (Birth Defects Original Article Series Vol. XV, No. 6). Alan R. Liss Publishers, New York, NY (1979).
5. Wertelecki, W.: Tetraploidy. In: Handbook of Clinical Neurology, Neurogenetic Directory. Ed., Myrianthopoulas, N.C., Part II, North-Holland Publishing Co., Amsterdam (1982).
6. Castilla, E., Penchaszadeh, V., Wertelecki, W., Youlton, R.: Prevention and Control of Genetic Diseases and Congenital Defects: Report of an Advisory Group. Pan American Health Organization/World Health Organization, 525 Twenty-Third Street, Washington, D.C., Scientific Publication No. 460 (1984).
7. Wertelecki, W.: Roberts Syndrome. Birth Defects Encyclopedia, 3rd Edition, Buyse, M.L., Editor. Blackwell/Year Book Medical Publishers, Inc. pp. 1498-1499 (1990).
8. Wertelecki, W.: Chromosome 22. Birth Defects Encyclopedia, 3rd Edition, Buyse, M.L., Editor. Blackwell/Year Book Medical Publishers, Inc. pp. 395 (1990).
9. Wertelecki, W.: A Regional Genetics Program in Alabama with Emphasis on Education and Clinicians - Achievements and Experience. In: Medical Genetics and Society. Eds., Fujiki, N., Bulyzhenkov, V., Bankowski, Z., Kugler Publications, Amsterdam/New York, (1991).
10. Wertelecki, W.: Diagnosis of NF-2. In: Neurofibromatosis 2. Eds., Cohen, B.R. Korf, B.H., Pugh, J.N., The National Neurofibromatosis Foundation, Inc., New York, NY (1992).
11. Wertelecki, W.: Clinical Dermatoglyphics. In: Human Malformations and Related Anomalies, Eds., Stevenson, R.E., Editor. Oxford University Press, Inc. (1993).
12. Wertelecki W.: Congenital Malformations in Rivne, Ukraine. 119–138. In: Crisis Without End: The Medical and Ecological Consequences of the Fukushima Nuclear Catastrophe. Helen Caldicott, editor. New Press, The, Oct 21, 304 pages (2014).

Further listing omitted.

== Current special projects ==
Among others:

- Mandatory Folic Acid Flour Fortification in Ukraine
- Prevention and Care of Spina Bifida and Related Disorders
- Distribution of urinary catheters to children with spina bifida
- Adolescence and Adult Developmental Patterns of Children with Fetal Alcohol Spectrum Disorders
- Continuing population-based surveillance of developmental anomalies upholding EUROCAT/ICBDSR standards of Cs-137 Incorporated Levels Trends

Distant Learning Modules

- Parents and Public
- Medical Students
- Health Care Providers

Sustenance of Contents in Dedicated Websites

- Teratology Information System in Vernacular (in Ukrainian)
- Clinical Signs – Eye Openers (Tutorials)
- Medical Terminology and Humanities (Tutorials)
- I.B.I.S. – International Birth Defects Information System (sailient extracts from International sources)
