= Warkany syndrome =

Warkany syndrome refers to one of two genetic disorders, both named for Austrian-American geneticist Joseph Warkany:

- Warkany syndrome 1, an X-linked syndrome linked to reduced head size and intellectual disability that is no longer diagnosed
- Trisomy 8, known as Warkany syndrome 2, a condition where a person has an extra copy of chromosome 8.
