= List of medical abbreviations: W =

Abbreviation	Meaning
WAIS(-R)	Wechsler Adult Intelligence Scale (Revised)
WAP	wandering atrial pacemaker (see multifocal atrial tachycardia)
WAS	Wiskott–Aldrich syndrome
WASP	Wiskott–Aldrich syndrome protein
WAT	white adipose tissue
WBAT	weight bearing as tolerated
WBC	white blood cell white blood cell count
WBI	whole bowel irrigation
WBRT	whole-brain radiotherapy treatment
WC	white cells or wheelchair
W/C	wheelchair
WD	well developed
WDL	within defined limits (as per hospital defined policy)
WH	well hydrated (not dehydrated or hyperhydrated)
WDWN	well developed and well nourished
WEE	Western equine encephalitis virus
WG	Wegener's granulomatosis (now known as granulomatosis with polyangiitis)
WISC-R	Wechsler intelligence scale for children revised
WLE	Wide local excision
WLS	Weight Loss Surgery
WM	white matter
WMA	wall motion abnormality (heart condition)
WN	well nourished
WNL	within normal limits (also: we never looked)
W/O w/o	without
WOB	Work Of Breathing (as in "normal WOB")
WOI	without incident
WPW	Wolff–Parkinson–White syndrome
WS	Waardenburg syndrome Warkany syndrome water-soluble Werner syndrome West syndrome Williams syndrome Wolfram syndrome
WSMW	women who have sex with men and women
WSW	women who have sex with women
wt	weight (whether human weight or otherwise)
w/u	Workup
