= Eurocat =

Eurocat or EUROCAT may refer to:

- Eurocat (transport), air traffic control system
- EUROCAT (medicine), a European organization
- Eurocat, an animated cat and official mascot of the Eurovision Song Contest 1990
