= Nazarov =

Nazarov (Russian: Назаров), or Nazarova (feminine; Назарова) is a Russian family name. The surname derives from the given name Nazar.

The surname may refer to:

- Alexander Nazarov (1925–1945), Soviet army officer and Hero of the Soviet Union
- Anna Nazarova (b. 1986), Russian long jumper
- Andrei Nazarov (b. 1965), Estonian athletics coach and retired decathlete
- Andrei Nazarov (b. 1974), Russian professional ice hockey player
- Daler Nazarov (b. 1959), Tajik composer, singer, and actor
- Dimitrij Nazarov (b. 1990), Azerbaijani-German footballer
- Dilshod Nazarov (b. 1980), Uzbek concertist-cellist, "Virtuosity Price" of III Int. Tchaîkovsky Competition
- Dilshod Nazarov (b. 1982), Tajikistani athlete
- Eduard Nazarov (1941–2016), Russian animator
- Fedor Nazarov (b. 1967), professor of mathematics in Michigan State University
- Gennady Nazarov (1967–2025), Soviet and Russian actor
- Ivan Nazarov (1906–1957), Soviet chemist and academician
- Karl Erik Nazarov (b. 1999), Estonian athlete, sprinter
- Klavdiya Nazarova (1920–1942), Soviet Komsomol member and Hero of the Soviet Union
- Lyudmyla Nazarova (born 1938), Ukrainian mathematician
- Natalia Nazarova (disambiguation), several people
- Olga Nazarova (disambiguation), several people
- Orzubek Nazarov (b. 1966), Kyrgyz boxer
- Paul Nazaroff (?–1942), Russian geologist and writer
- Sharif Nazarov (1946–2025), Tajikistani football coach
- Vyacheslav Nazarov (1952–1996), Soviet/American jazzman
- Murod Nazarov (b. 1980), vice-president of the polo federation of Uzbekistan
