= Nazar Ghazali =

Iraqi bodybuilder (born 1984)

Nazar Ghazali نزار غزالي
- Professional bodybuilder

Personal info
- Nickname: Nazar Ghazali
- Full name: Nazar Ahmed Hussien
- Born: April 10, 1984 (age 42); Duhok, Iraq

Best statistics

Professional (Pro) career
- Pro-debut: Duhok championship - 1998; 1998
- Best win: Diamond cup in Greece - 1st in 2016; 2016

Nazar Ghazali (Arabic: نزار غزالي, Kurdish: نزار غەزالی; born April 10, 1984) is a professional Iraqi-Kurdish bodybuilder. The first Kurdish athlete in the field of bodybuilding, Ghazali holds high certificates in the field of bodybuilding and the owner of the highest championships in the region, and is a personal trainer for President Nechirvan Barzani, President of the Iraqi Kurdistan region.

== Competitive history ==
- 2000, first place in the Duhok championship, at the Iraq level.
- 2001, first place in the Iraq championship in Mosul.
- 2003, first place in the Kurdistan championship.
- 2004, gold medal in the Arab countries championship in Jordan.
- 2004, silver medal at the Asian championship held in Bahrain.
- 2009, first place and gold medal at the Asian championship in Thailand.
- 2011, seventh place at the world championship in India.
- 2013, first place at an international championship in Hungary.
- 2014, second place and silver medal at the Arnold Classic championship in Madrid, Spain.
- 2016, first place and gold medal at the IFBB Diamond Cup championship in Athens, Greece.

== See also ==
- List of IFBB member federations
- List of male professional bodybuilders
- IFBB Professional League
