= Warkany syndrome 1 =

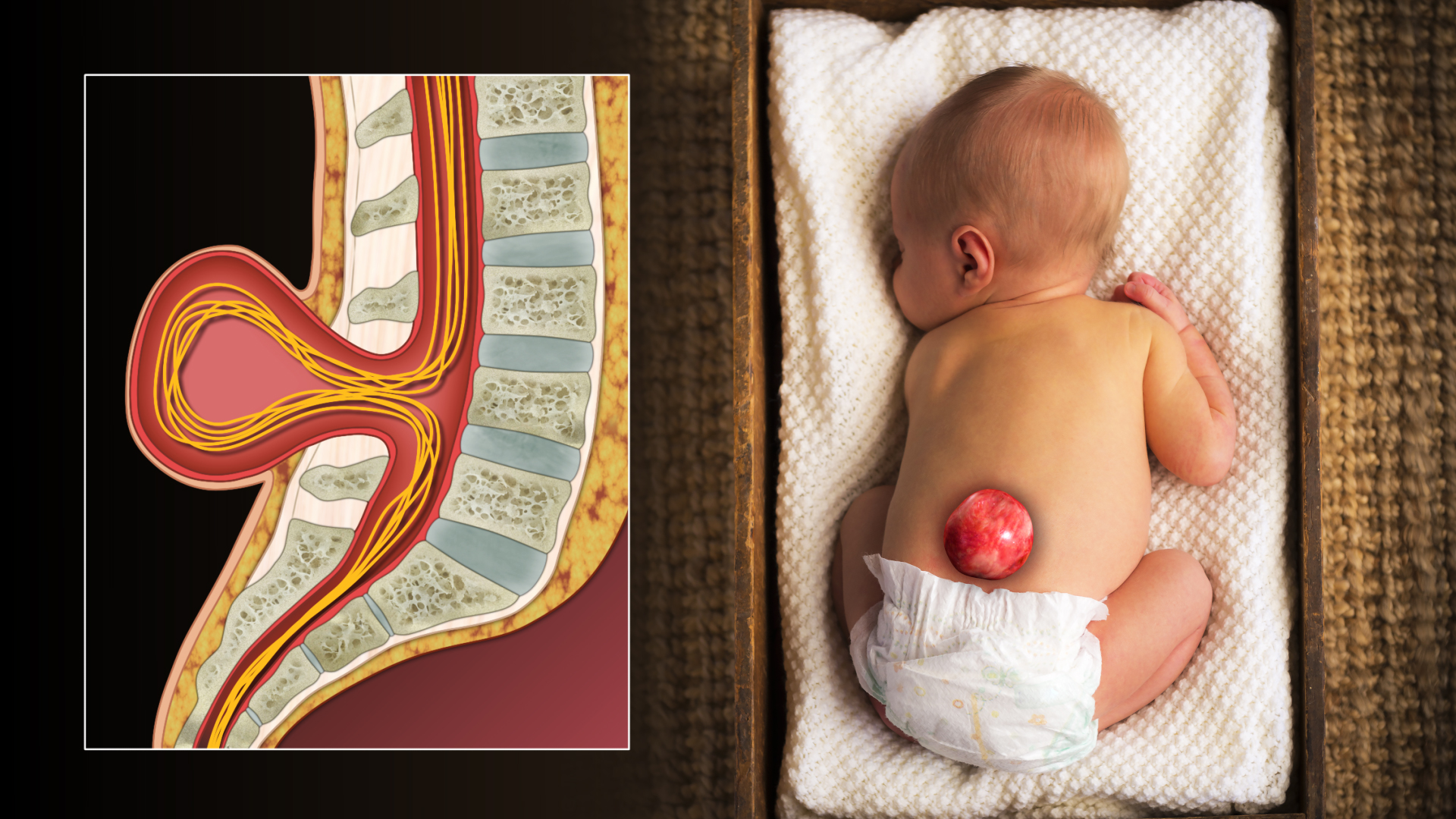

Warkany syndrome 1 was an X-chromosome linked recessive genetic condition originally described by Joseph Warkany in 1961 as part of an article on intrauterine growth retardation - the condition is no longer diagnosed. The family history was consistent with X-linked recessive inheritance of intrauterine growth retardation and small head size, but these features are not unique to this condition and no linkage to a specific gene was ever established. In fact, the condition appears to have been abandoned, given that the OMIM number (308400) assigned to it () and listed in a review article on X-linked intellectual disability has been removed from the OMIM database. Furthermore, this condition is no longer mentioned in a more recent review of X-linked intellectual disability.

== See also ==
- Trisomy 8, which causes Warkany syndrome 2
