= RC Rivne =

Ukrainian rugby union club, based in Rivne

- Full name: Rugby Club Rivne
- Founded: 14 December 1999; 26 years ago
- Location: Rivne, Ukraine
- Ground: Olymp Stadium
- President: Sergey Kurhansky
- Coach: Igor Rodzyak
Team kit

RC Rivne (Ukrainian: РК Рівне, romanized: RK Rivne) is a Ukrainian rugby union club in Rivne.

== History ==
The club was founded in 1999.
