= Bodybuilding in Iraq =

- Country: Iraq
- National team(s): Iraq

Bodybuilding in Iraq is supported by a national organization that has international recognition. Bodybuilders from the country have competed in international events.

== History ==
In 2013, the Kazakhstani Bodybuilding and Fitness Federation hosted the Asian Championship in Almaty at the Baluan Sholak Sport Palace. Hadi Ali Shnain competed in the junior men's under 70kg group. Fadhil Hussein competed in the master men's category 50-59 group.

== Governance ==
Iraq has a national organization that is a recognized by the International Federation of Bodybuilding and Fitness as a national federation, representing the country's bodybuilding community. The national federation is a member of the Asian Bodybuilding and Physique Sports Federation.
