= Nazar Shah Alam =

- Nazar in 2024
- Born: Nazar Alam; 5 September 1989 (age 37); Tangan-Tangan, Southwest Aceh Regency, Aceh, Indonesia
- Other name: Nazar "Apache"
- Occupations: Singer; songwriter
- Spouse: Rafiqah Annisa (m. 2018)
- Parents: Alamsyah; Armiji
- Relatives: Afzhal de Armilamsyah (brother) Humaira Salvy (sister)
- Musical career
- Origin: Aceh, Indonesia
- Genres: World music; reggae; ska
- Instrument: Vocals
- Years active: 2013–present
- Member of: Apache13

Nazar Shah Alam (born Nazar Alam; 5 September 1989), better known as Nazar "Apache" is an Acehnese singer. He is the lead singer of the Indonesian band Apache13.

== Early life and education ==
Nazar was born as Nazar Alam in Kuta Bak Drien, a village (gampong) in Tangan-Tangan District, Southwest Aceh Regency, Aceh, to Alamsyah and Armiji. He was the first of three children born to the couple. he later added "Shah" to his name when publishing his work at Serambi Indonesia, a news outlet based in Aceh.

Nazar has shown interest in literature as early as elementary school, though access to education was limited in his regency, though he failed to pass high school due to administration problems in 2007, he graduated in 2008 and later moving to Banda Aceh to attend university. Initially, he attended Ar-Raniry State Islamic University, but due to financial problems, he had to move universities to Syiah Kuala University at the age of 18, majoring in Indonesian literature. During his university attendance, he became active in theatre performances, becoming known for being a poet.

== Career ==
=== Apache13 ===
Nazar has shown interest in music as early as middle school, though he never took it too seriously until an earthquake struck Aceh in 2008, where he and his peers started fund-raising for the victims through music, with Nazar being the vocalist in the group. Nazar and his peers continued performing often in campus and local cafes, where he later, alongside Ikram Fahmi, officially founded Apache13 in late 2013, later joined by Amek, Teuku Munawar, and Dharma Putra.

Though the band struggled in its early days, nearly leading to the disbandment of the group, they found sudden success when their song "Mona" in their first album "Bek Panik" ("Don't Panic") exploded in popularity in 2016.

=== Politics ===
Nazar has ventured into politics as early as 2022, where he submitted a letter of support of a Regional Representative Council candidate to the General Elections Commission of Aceh.

In the 2024 Indonesian legislative election, Nazar ran for a seat in the Regional Representative Council representing Aceh. He failed to be elected with only 52,020 votes, but became the second most voted person in his home regency of Southwest Aceh with 18,484 votes. Nazar has also been endorsed to be the vice regent of Southwest Aceh. In May 2024, Nazar joined the Indonesian Solidarity Party branch in Aceh.

== Personal life ==
On 15 August 2018, Nazar married his current wife at the Baiturrahman Grand Mosque.

During an exclusive interview with Tinjauan, Nazar says that he considers "Keukai Lam Rateb" ("Everlasting in Dhikr") as his best work due to its soulfulness.
