= Josef Warkany =

Josef Warkany (1902–1992) was a Jewish Austrian American pediatrician known as the "father of teratology".

== Early life ==
Warkany was born in Vienna and this is where he completed his medical studies. By 1932, he had published over 23 articles, before moving to Cincinnati, Ohio, on January 5, 1932, where he remained for the rest of his life.

== Career ==
Two genetic syndromes are named for him: Warkany syndrome 1 and Warkany syndrome 2 is named after him. He received the John Howland Award from the American Pediatric Society (APS), the society's highest honor.

== Death ==
He died at the age of 90 in 1992 at Scarlet Oaks Retirement Community in Clifton, Ohio, near the city of Cincinnati.

== Awards ==
Warkany received many awards in his lifetime for his work, including:

- Academy of Pediatrics Mead Johnson Award (1943)
- Academy of Pediatrics Borden Award (1950)
- Modern Medicine Award for Distinguished Achievement (1964)
- Academy of Pediatrics John Howland Award (1970)
- Charles H. Hood Foundation Award (1972)
- American Association on Mental Deficiency Research Award (1976)
- Procter Medal Award for Distinguished Research (1979)
- March of Dimes Basil O'Connor Award (1986)
