= Rivne =

City and administrative center of Rivne Oblast, Ukraine

Rivne Рівне
- City
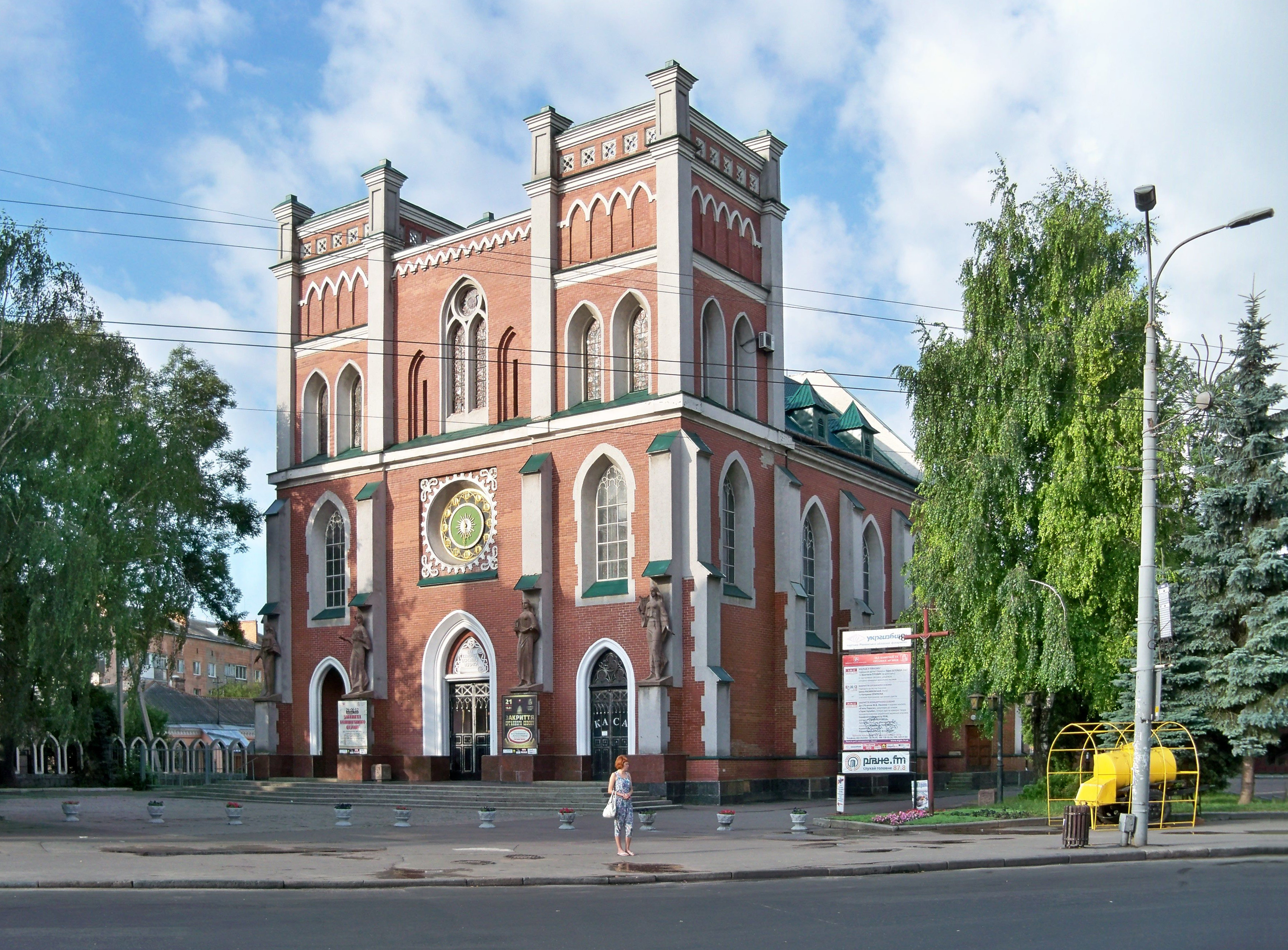
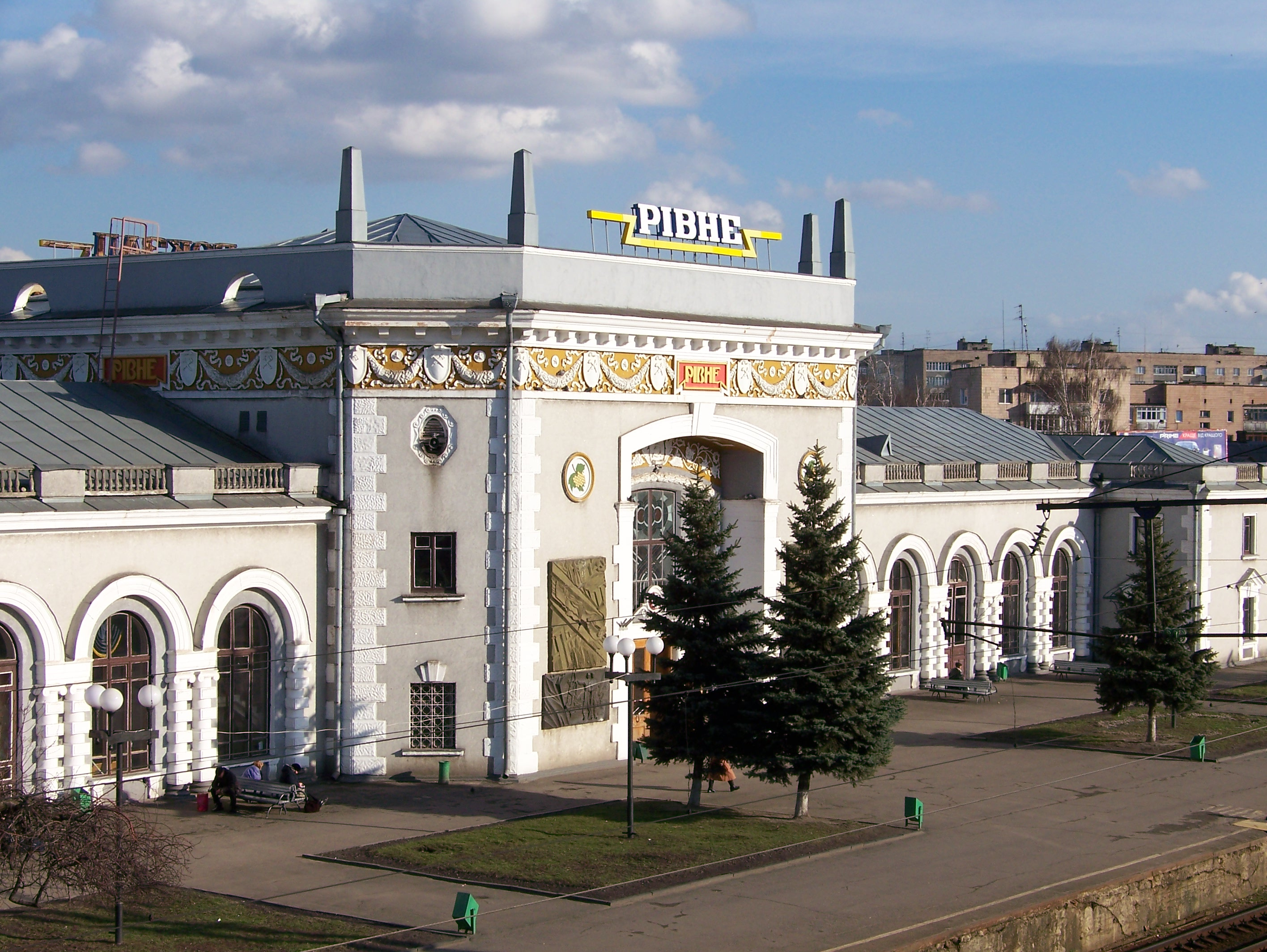
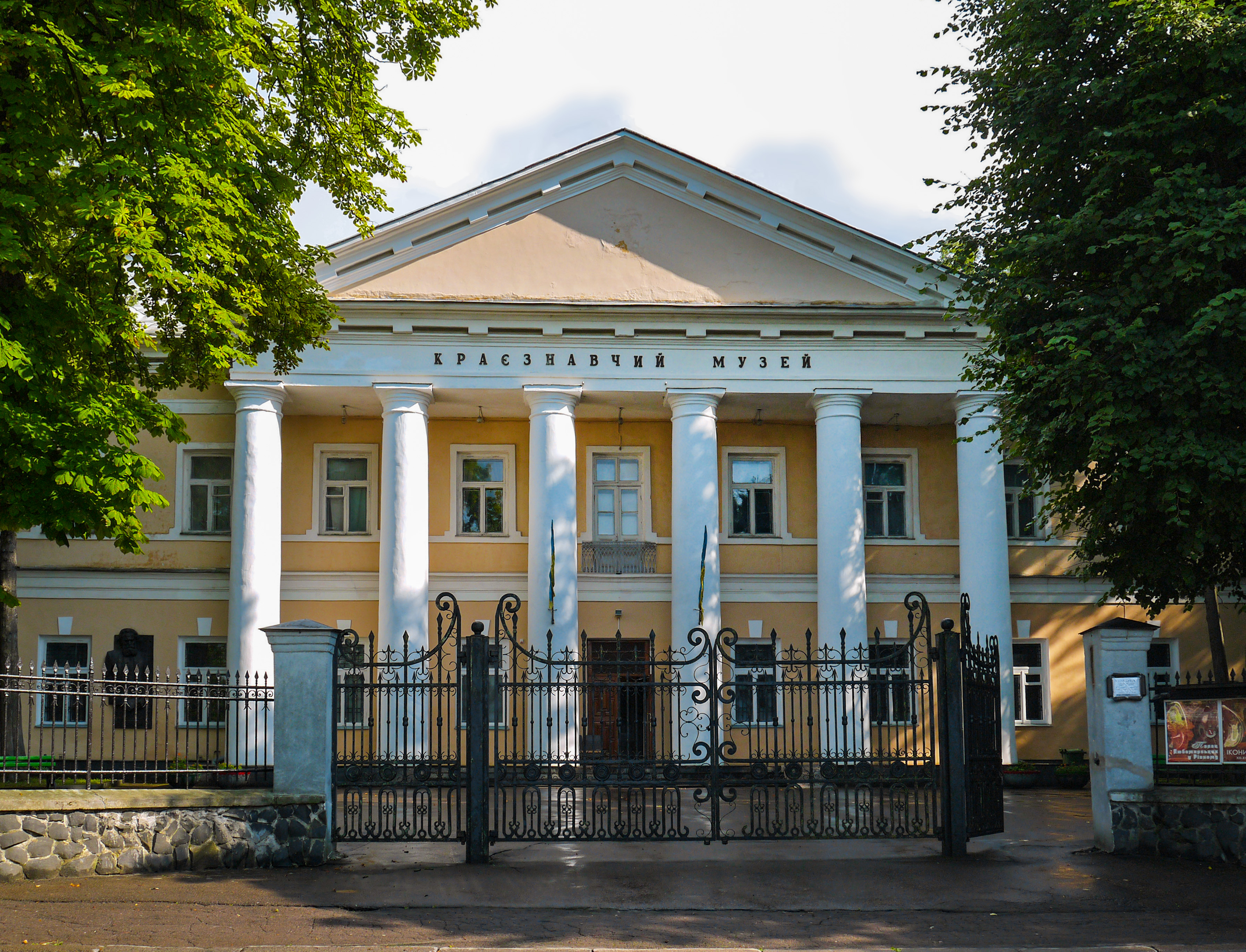
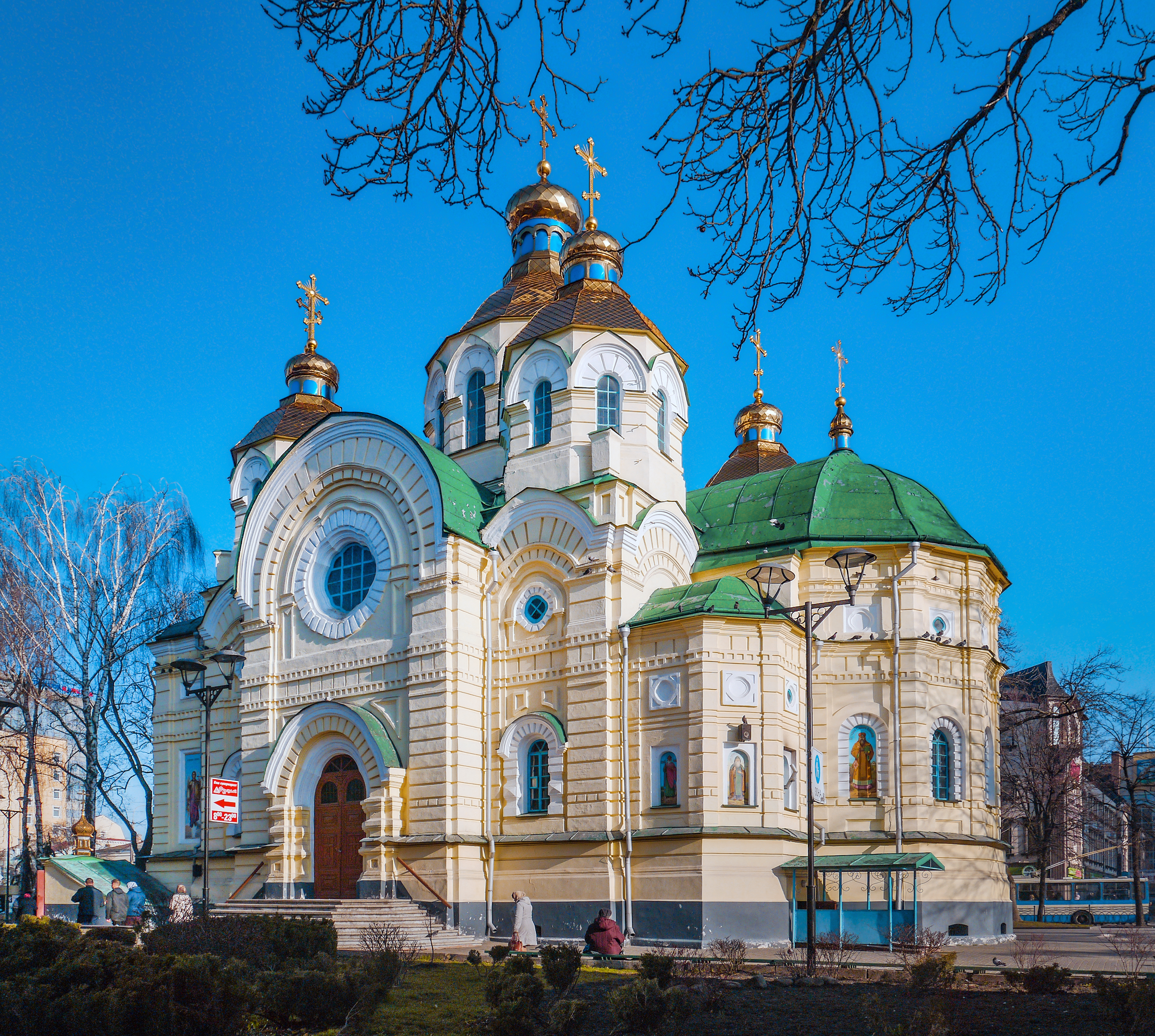
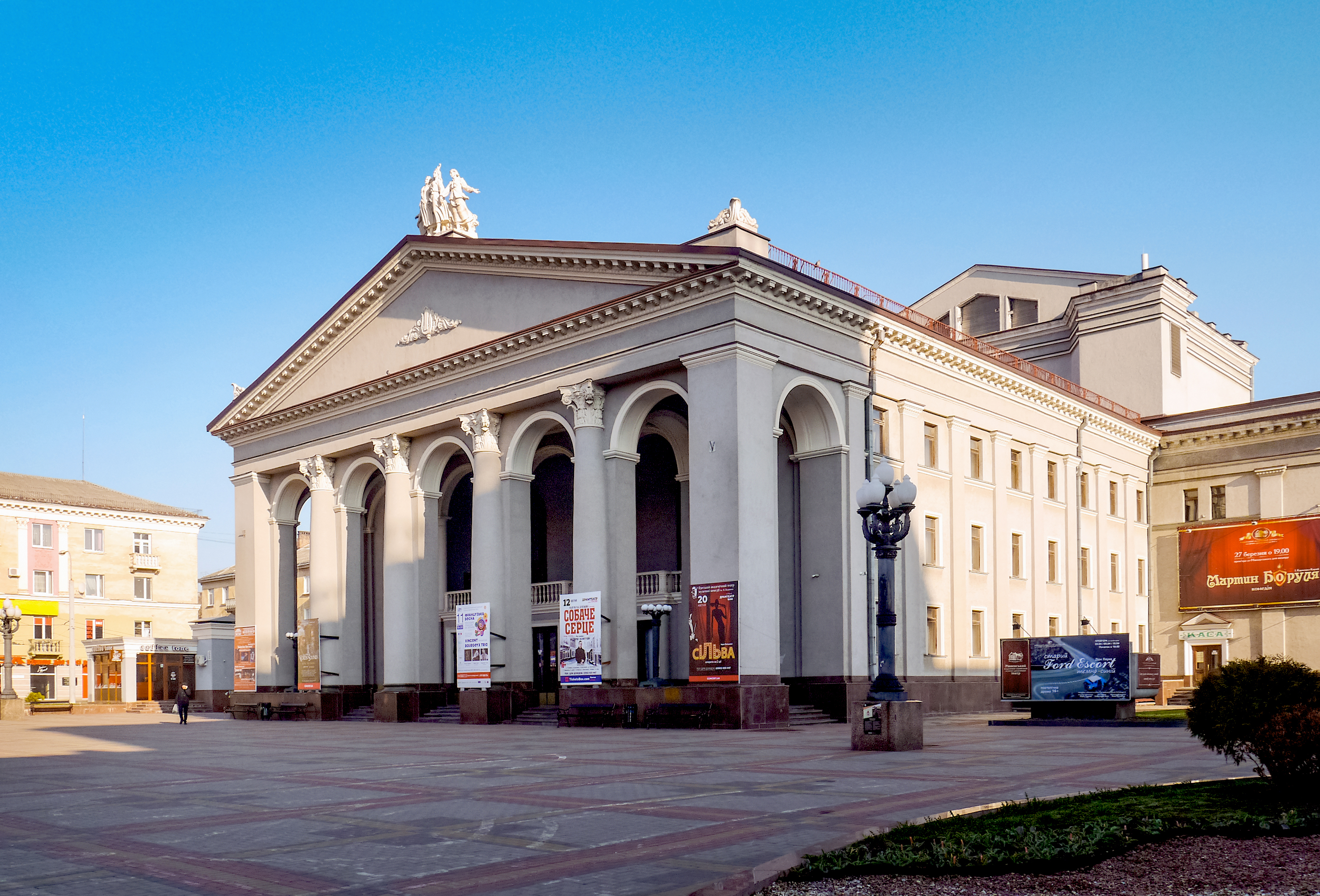
- Church of St. Anthony of Padua (now House of Organ Music) Main railway station Museum Resurrection Cathedral Music and Drama Theater

- Flag Coat of arms Brandmark

- Location within Rivne Oblast Location within Ukraine
- Coordinates: 50°37′09″N 26°15′07″E
- Country: Ukraine
- Oblast: Rivne Oblast
- Raion: Rivne Raion
- Hromada: Rivne urban hromada
- First mentioned: 1283

Government
  - Mayor: Viktor Shakyrzian (acting)

Area
  - Total: 58.00 km^{2} (22.39 sq mi)

Population (2022)
  - Total: 243,873
  - Density: 4,205/km^{2} (10,890/sq mi)
- Time zone: UTC+2 (CET)
  - Summer (DST): UTC+3 (CEST)
- Website: city-adm.rv.ua

Rivne (/ˈrɪvnə/ RIV-nə; Ukrainian: Рівне, IPA: [ˈr⁽ʲ⁾iu̯ne]) is a city in western Ukraine. The city is the administrative center of Rivne Oblast (province), as well as the Rivne Raion (district) within the oblast. It has a population of 243,873 (2022 estimate).

First mentioned in the late 13th century, Rivne developed under the rule of Lithuania and Poland due to its location on the route connecting Kyiv and Volodymyr. In the late 15th century the city was awarded Magdeburg Law. From the late 16th century it belonged to Ostrogski and Lubomirski noble families. Annexed by the Russian Empire in 1793, during the latter half of the 19th century Rivne experienced rapid development due to its role as a railway hub. In the spring of 1919 it served as a provisional seat of the Ukrainian government throughout the ongoing war with Soviet Russia. Between World War I and World War II, the city belonged to Poland as a district-level (county) seat of Wołyń Voivodeship. At the start of World War II in 1939, Rivne was occupied by the Soviet Red Army and received its current status by becoming a seat of regional government of the Rivne Oblast, which was created out of the eastern portion of the voivodeship. During the German occupation of 1941–44 the city was designated as the capital of Reichskommissariat Ukraine.

Rivne is an important transportation hub, with the international Rivne Airport, and rail links to Zdolbuniv, Sarny, and Kovel, as well as highways linking it with Brest, Kyiv and Lviv. Among other leading companies there is a chemical factory of Rivne-Azot (part of Ostchem Holding).

== Names ==
- Russian: Ровно, romanized: Rovno, also the former spelling in Ukrainian until 1991 (Note: Ukrainian: Ровно)
- Polish: Równe
- Yiddish: ראָוונע

== History ==
=== Early history ===
Rivne was first mentioned in 1283 in the Polish annals Rocznik kapituły krakowskiej as one of the inhabited places of Halych-Volhynia near which Leszek II the Black was victorious over a part of the Grand Ducal Lithuanian Army. Following the Kingdom of Galicia–Volhynia's partition after Galicia–Volhynia Wars in the late 14th century, it was under the rule of Grand Duchy of Lithuania and in 1434 the Grand Duke of Lithuania Švitrigaila awarded the settlement to a Lutsk nobleman Dychko. In 1461 Dychko sold his settlement to Prince Semen Nesvizh. In 1479 Semen Nesvizh died and his settlement was passed to his wife Maria who started to call herself princess of Rivne. She turned the settlement into a princely residence by building in 1481 a castle on one of local river islands and managed to obtain Magdeburg rights for the settlement in 1492 from the King of Poland Casimir IV Jagiellon. Following her death in 1518, the city was passed on to the princes of Ostrog and declined by losing its status as a princely residency.

In 1566 the town of Rivne became part of newly established Volhynian Voivodeship. Following the Union of Lublin in 1569, it was transferred from the Grand Duchy of Lithuania to the Kingdom of Poland. The city had a status of a private town held by nobles (Ostrogski and Lubomirski families). Following the Second Partition of Poland in 1795 Rivne became a part of the Russian Empire, and in 1797 it was declared to be a county level (uyezd) town of the Volhynian Governorate.

=== Early 20th century ===
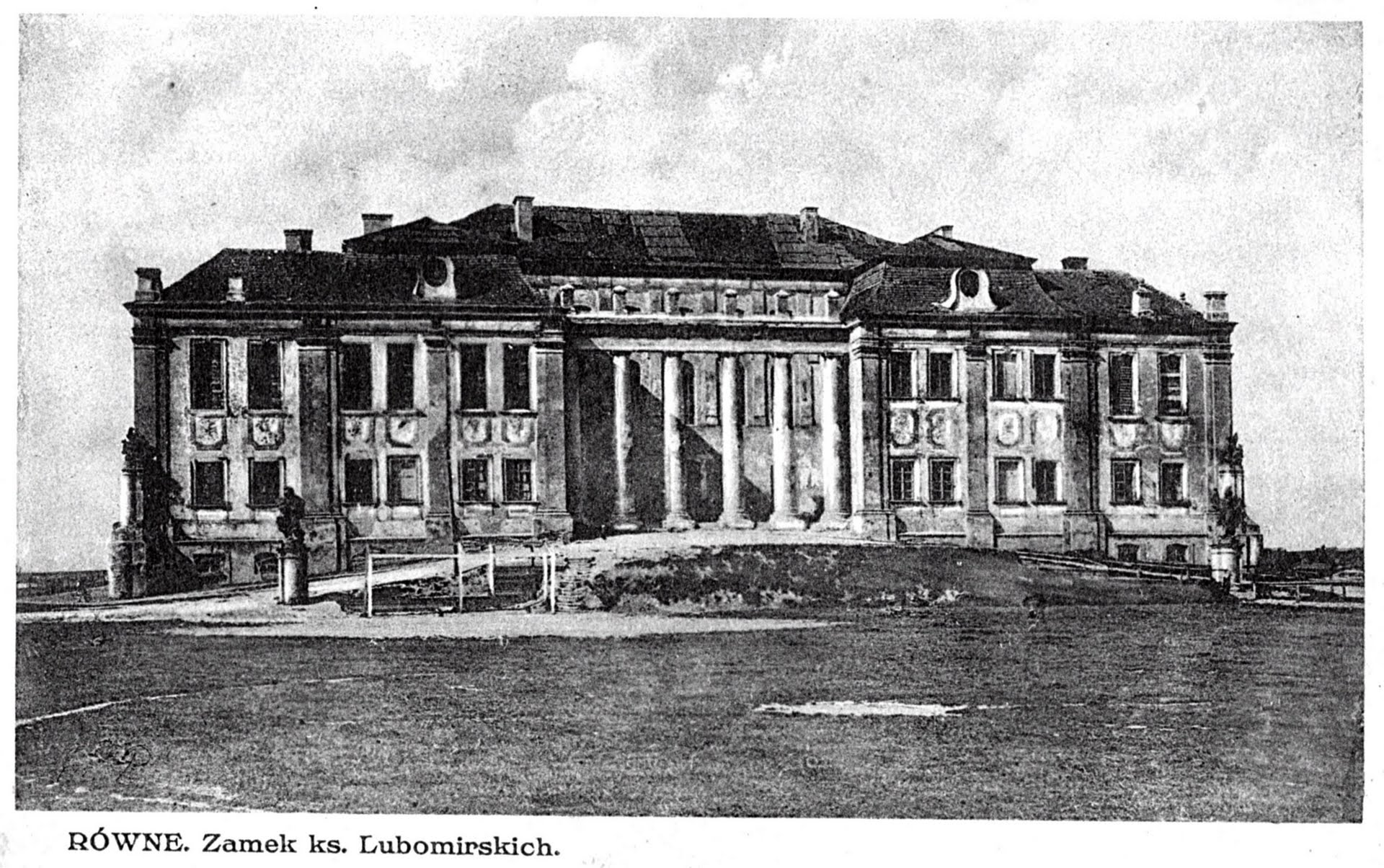
Lubomirski Palace, 1945

During World War I and the period of chaos shortly after, it was briefly under German, Ukrainian, Bolshevik, and Polish rule. During April–May 1919 Rivne served as the temporary capital of the Ukrainian People's Republic. In late April 1919 one of the Ukrainian military leaders Volodymyr Oskilko attempted to organize a coup-d'état against the Directorate led by Symon Petliura and the cabinet of Borys Martos and replace them with Yevhen Petrushevych as president of Ukraine. In Rivne, Oskilko managed to arrest most of the cabinet ministers including Martos himself, but Petliura at that time was in neighboring Zdolbuniv and managed to stop Oskilko's efforts. At the conclusion of the conflict, in accordance with the Riga Peace Treaty of 1921, it became a part of the Polish Volhynian Voivodeship, a situation which would last until the Second World War. Before World War II, Rivne (Równe) was a mainly Jewish-Polish city (Jews constituted about 50% of the city's population, and Poles 35%).

=== World War II ===
On 17 September 1939, as a result of the Molotov–Ribbentrop Pact and the partition of Poland, Rivne was occupied by the Soviet Union. Starting December of that year Rivne became the center of the newly established Rivne Oblast in the Ukrainian SSR. The Soviets operated a prisoner-of-war camp in the city, in which over 14,500 POWs were held as of July 1940. Over 30 Poles who were either born or lived and worked in Równe, including policemen, school teachers, commanders and doctors of the local military hospital, tax inspectors and corrections officers, as well as several Polish prisoners of war captured near Równe, several Poles who fought in the Battle of Równe in 1920, and many Polish POWs from the local POW camp were murdered by the Russians in the Katyn massacre in 1940.

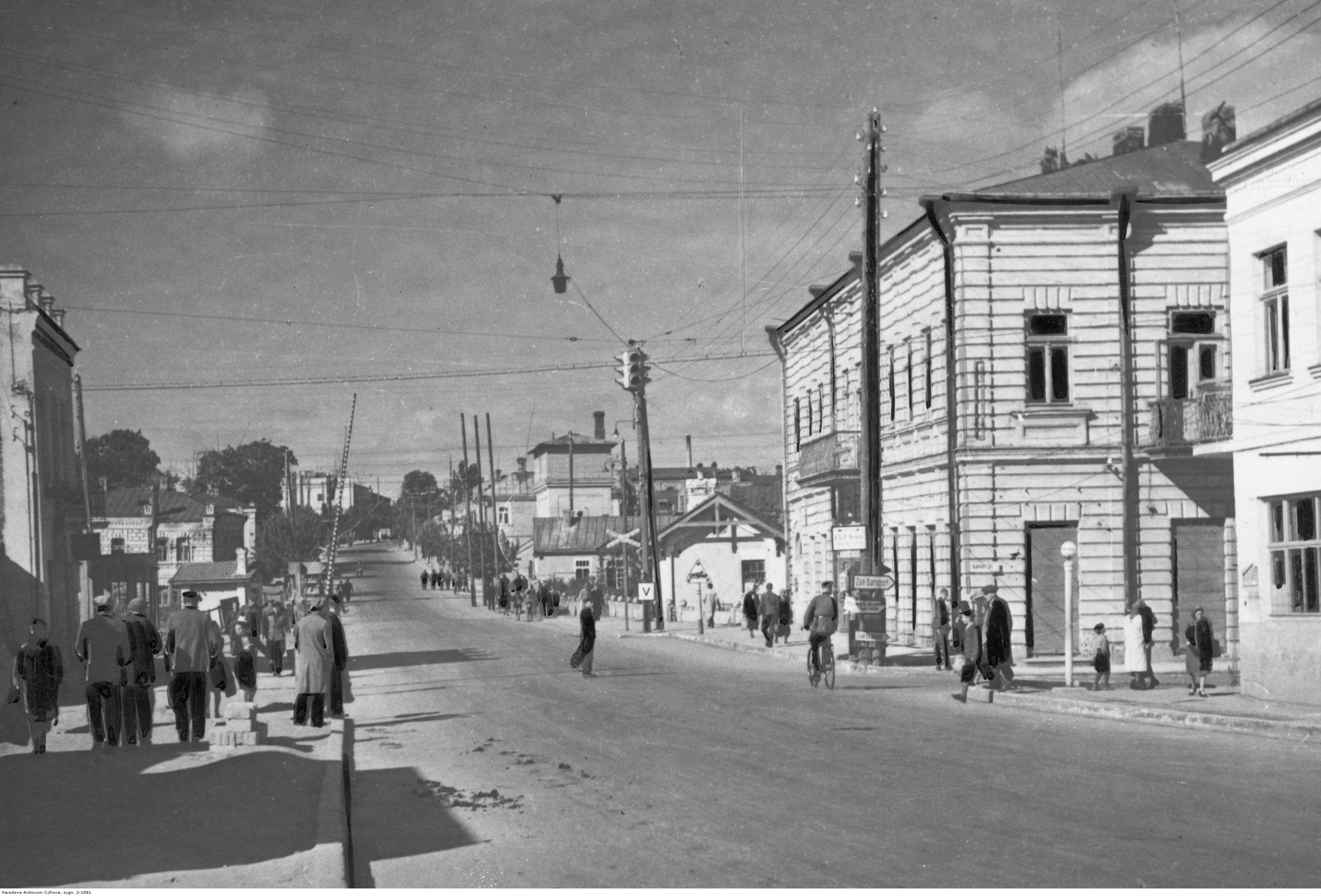
Równe in 1941

On 28 June 1941 Rivne was invaded by the 6th Army of Nazi Germany. On 20 August, the Nazis declared it the administrative center of Reichskommissariat Ukraine. A Gestapo prison opened on Belaia Street.

On 6–8 November, 17,500 Jewish adults from Rivne were shot to death or thrown alive into a large pit in a pine grove in Sosenki, a nearby wooded area (sometimes referred to as Sosenki Forest), and 6,000 Jewish children suffered the same fate at a nearby site. From 8–13 November German actor Olaf Bach was flown to the city to perform for the German forces. The city's remaining Jews were sent to Rivne Ghetto. In July 1942, they were sent 70 km (43 mi) north to Kostopil and shot to death.

On 2 February 1944, the city was captured by the Red Army in the Battle of Rivne, and remained under Soviet control until Ukraine regained its independence on the break-up of the USSR in 1991. Poles from Rivne were deported to Poland's new borders after 1945.

=== Post-war era ===
In 1958, a TV tower began broadcasting in the city; in 1969, the first trolley ran through the city; in 1969, Rivne airport opened. In 1983, the city celebrated its 700th anniversary.

On 11 June 1991, the Ukrainian parliament officially renamed the city Rivne according to the rules of Ukrainian orthography. It had previously been known as Rovno.

=== Russo-Ukrainian War ===
On 14 March 2022, Rivne TV Tower experienced heavy missile attack by Russian troops. The tower was damaged and an administrative room was destroyed. As a result of the attack 20 people were killed and nine injured.

== Population ==
Historical population
Year	Pop.	±%
1897	24,573	—
1921	30,482	+24.0%
1939	43,000	+41.1%
1959	59,598	+38.6%
1970	115,541	+93.9%
1979	178,956	+54.9%
1989	227,925	+27.4%
2001	248,813	+9.2%
2011	249,840	+0.4%
2022	243,873	−2.4%

=== Ethnic groups ===
Distribution of the population by ethnicity according to the 2001 Ukrainian census:

Ethnic groups in Rivne
	percent
Ukrainians	91.56%
Russians	6.77%
Belarusians	0.59%
Poles	0.35%
Jews	0.14%
Czechs	0.06%
Azerbaijanis	0.06%
Armenians	0.05%
Germans	0.04%

=== Language ===
Distribution of the population by native language according to the 2001 census:

Language	Number	Percentage
Ukrainian	225 899	92.08%
Russian	18 346	7.48%
Other or undecided	1 078	0.44%
Total	245 323	100.00%

According to a survey conducted by the International Republican Institute in April–May 2023, 96% of the city's population spoke Ukrainian at home, and 3% spoke Russian.

== Geography ==
=== Climate ===
Rivne has a moderate continental climate with cold, snowy winters and warm summers. Snow cover usually lasts from November until March. The average annual precipitation is 598 mm (24 in) June and July being the wettest months and January and February the driest.

Climate data for Rivne, Ukraine (1991–2020, extremes 1951–present)
Month	Jan	Feb	Mar	Apr	May	Jun	Jul	Aug	Sep	Oct	Nov	Dec	Year
Record high °C (°F)	13.9 (57.0)	16.7 (62.1)	26.2 (79.2)	30.5 (86.9)	33.0 (91.4)	36.5 (97.7)	35.3 (95.5)	39.0 (102.2)	36.4 (97.5)	26.2 (79.2)	21.2 (70.2)	14.5 (58.1)	39.0 (102.2)
Mean daily maximum °C (°F)	−0.9 (30.4)	0.7 (33.3)	6.2 (43.2)	14.5 (58.1)	20.3 (68.5)	23.4 (74.1)	25.3 (77.5)	25.0 (77.0)	19.3 (66.7)	12.7 (54.9)	5.6 (42.1)	0.5 (32.9)	12.7 (54.9)
Daily mean °C (°F)	−3.4 (25.9)	−2.4 (27.7)	1.9 (35.4)	9.0 (48.2)	14.4 (57.9)	17.8 (64.0)	19.5 (67.1)	18.9 (66.0)	13.7 (56.7)	8.1 (46.6)	2.7 (36.9)	−1.8 (28.8)	8.2 (46.8)
Mean daily minimum °C (°F)	−5.9 (21.4)	−5.2 (22.6)	−1.8 (28.8)	3.7 (38.7)	8.9 (48.0)	12.3 (54.1)	14.0 (57.2)	13.1 (55.6)	8.7 (47.7)	4.2 (39.6)	0.2 (32.4)	−4.1 (24.6)	4.0 (39.2)
Record low °C (°F)	−34.5 (−30.1)	−32.6 (−26.7)	−26.3 (−15.3)	−11.5 (11.3)	−3.8 (25.2)	2.0 (35.6)	5.7 (42.3)	1.8 (35.2)	−3.5 (25.7)	−10.0 (14.0)	−20.1 (−4.2)	−26.1 (−15.0)	−34.5 (−30.1)
Average precipitation mm (inches)	32 (1.3)	31 (1.2)	35 (1.4)	38 (1.5)	66 (2.6)	75 (3.0)	94 (3.7)	58 (2.3)	58 (2.3)	45 (1.8)	36 (1.4)	41 (1.6)	601 (23.7)
Average extreme snow depth cm (inches)	6 (2.4)	7 (2.8)	5 (2.0)	0 (0)	0 (0)	0 (0)	0 (0)	0 (0)	0 (0)	0 (0)	1 (0.4)	4 (1.6)	7 (2.8)
Average rainy days	8	7	10	13	15	17	16	12	15	13	12	11	149
Average snowy days	17	17	10	3	0.2	0	0	0	0.03	1	8	15	71
Average relative humidity (%)	86.9	84.6	77.8	67.2	68.3	71.5	73.5	71.3	76.7	81.2	87.2	88.6	77.9
Source 1: Pogoda.ru
Source 2: NOAA (humidity 1991–2020)

== Industry ==
During Soviet times the provincial town was transformed into an industrial center of the republic. There were two significant factories built. The first was a machine building and metal processing factory capable of producing high-voltage apparatus, tractor spare parts and others. The other was a chemical factory and synthetic materials fabrication plant. Light industry, including a linen plant and a textile mill, as well as food industries, including milk and meat processing plants and a vegetable preservation plant, have also been built. In addition the city became a production center for furniture and other building materials.

== Landmarks ==
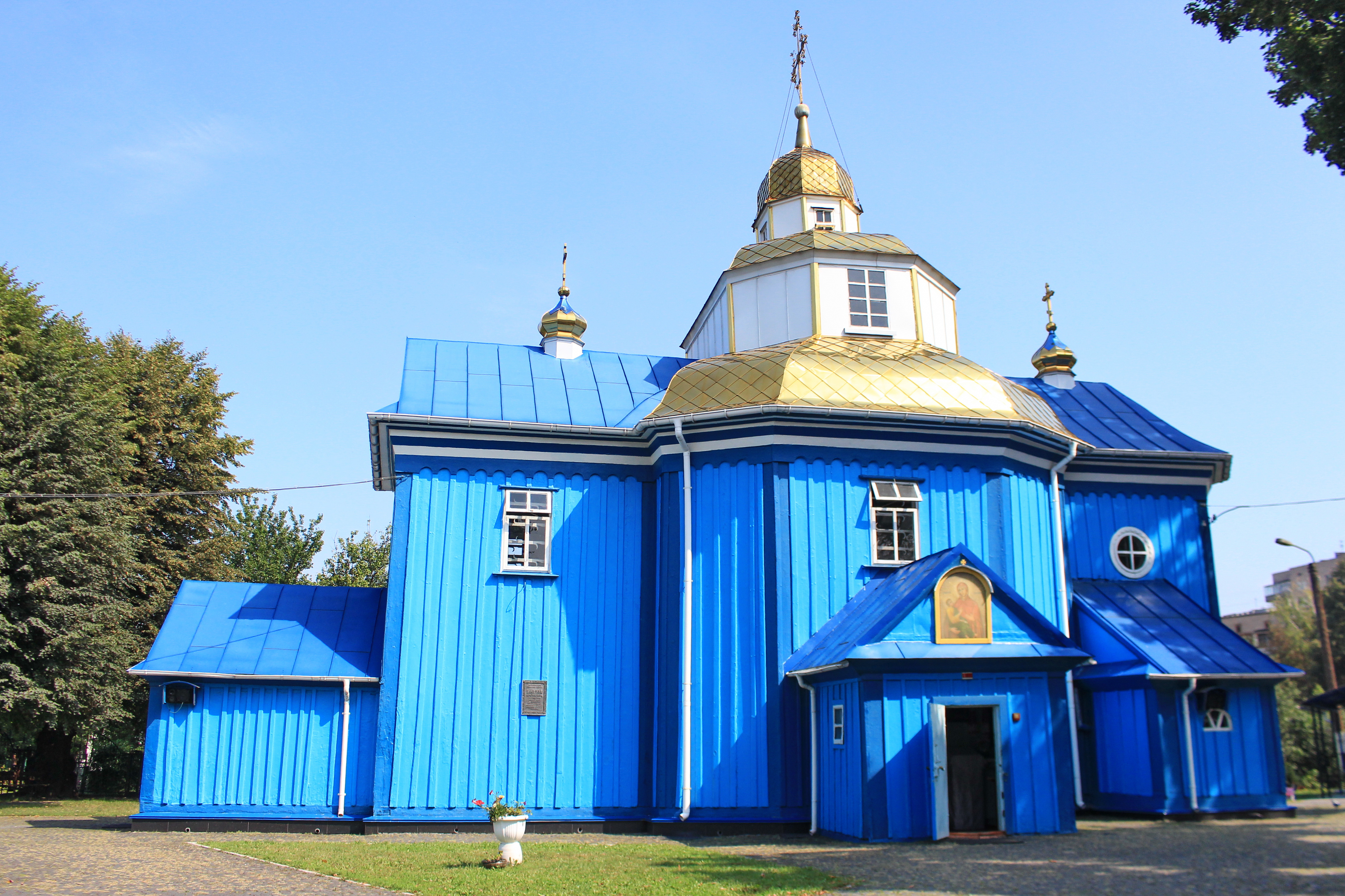
Church of the Assumption

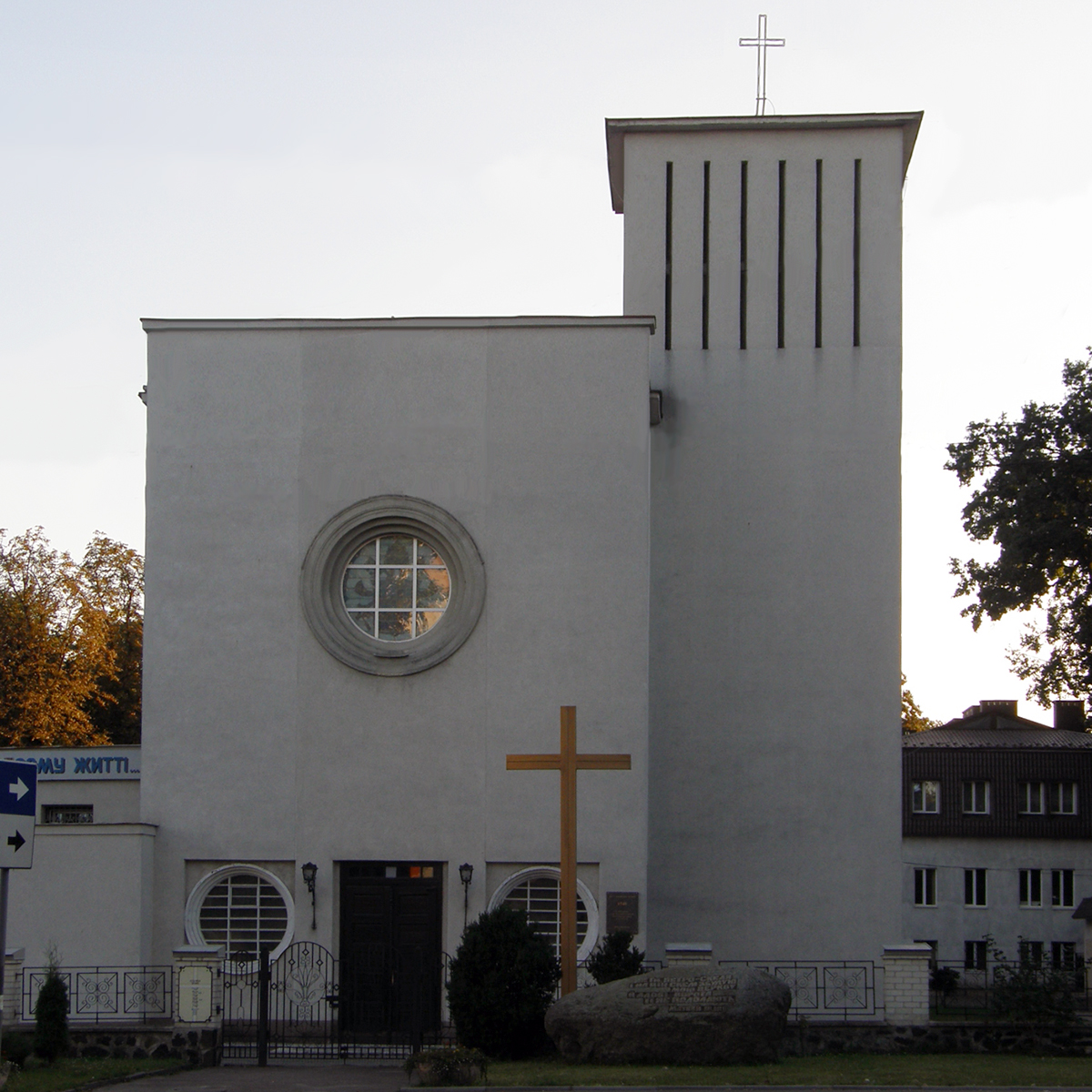
Saint Peter and Paul church

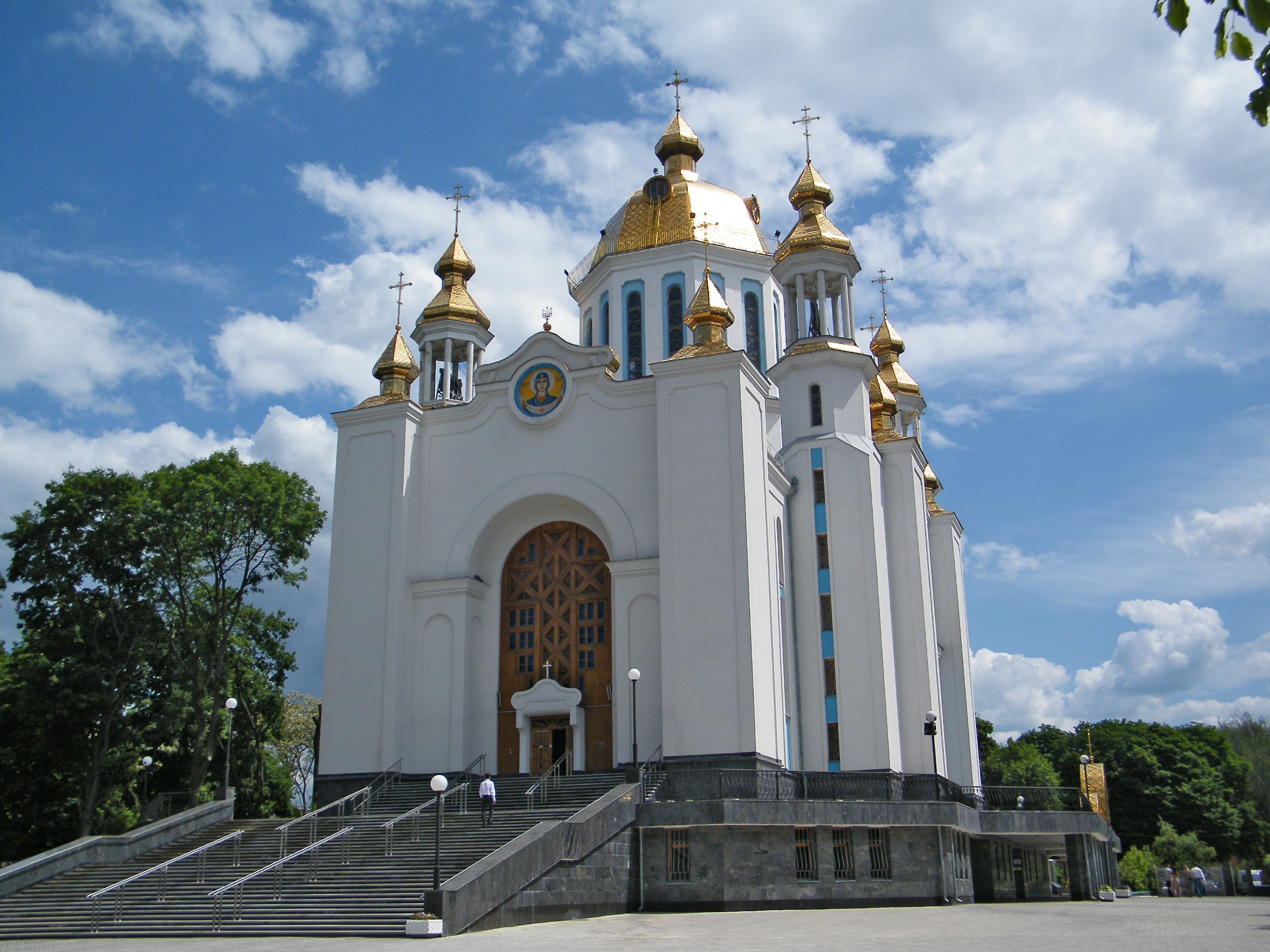
Cathedral of the Intercession

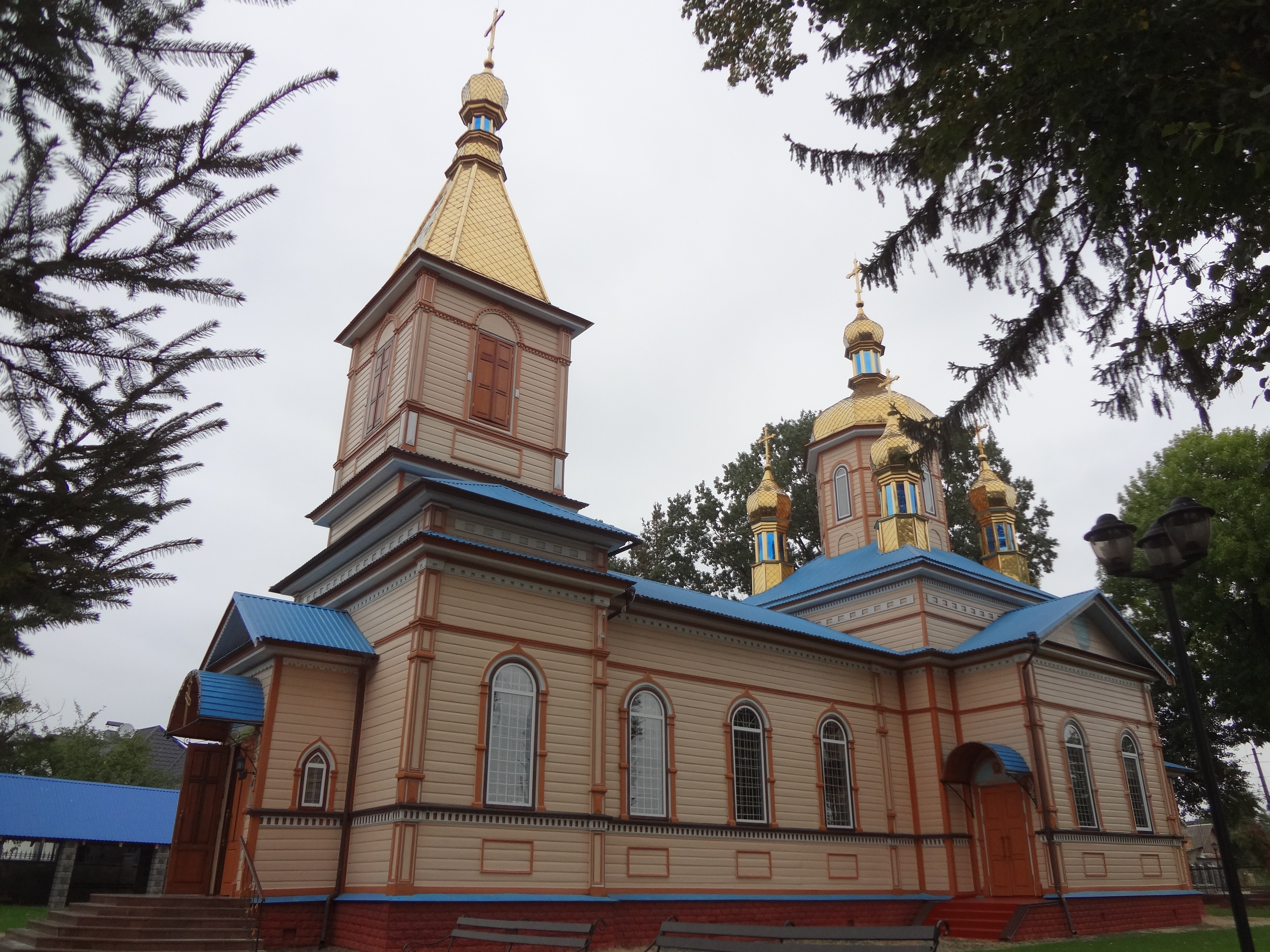
Holy Trinity church

As an important cultural center, Rivne hosts a humanities and a hydro-engineering university, as well as a faculty of the Kyiv State Institute of Culture, and medical and musical as well as automobile-construction, commercial, textile, agricultural and cooperative polytechnic colleges. The city has a historical museum.

Following the fall of the Soviet Union, the monument for the Soviet hero Dmitry Medvedev was removed, and the Nikolai Kuznetsov monument was moved to another location within the city. Instead, in order to reflect the controversial history of the region the monuments for "People who died in the honor of Ukraine", and "Soldiers who died in local military battles" were installed.

=== Buildings ===
- Church of the Assumption (1756)
- Cathedral of the Intercession (2001)
- Cathedral of the Ascension (1890)
- A classicism-style gymnasium building (1839)
- During Soviet times the center of the city from Lenin street to Peace Avenue (1963 architects R.D. Vais and O.I. Filipchuk) was completely rebuilt with Administrative and Public buildings in neo-classical, Stalinist style.

=== Memorials ===
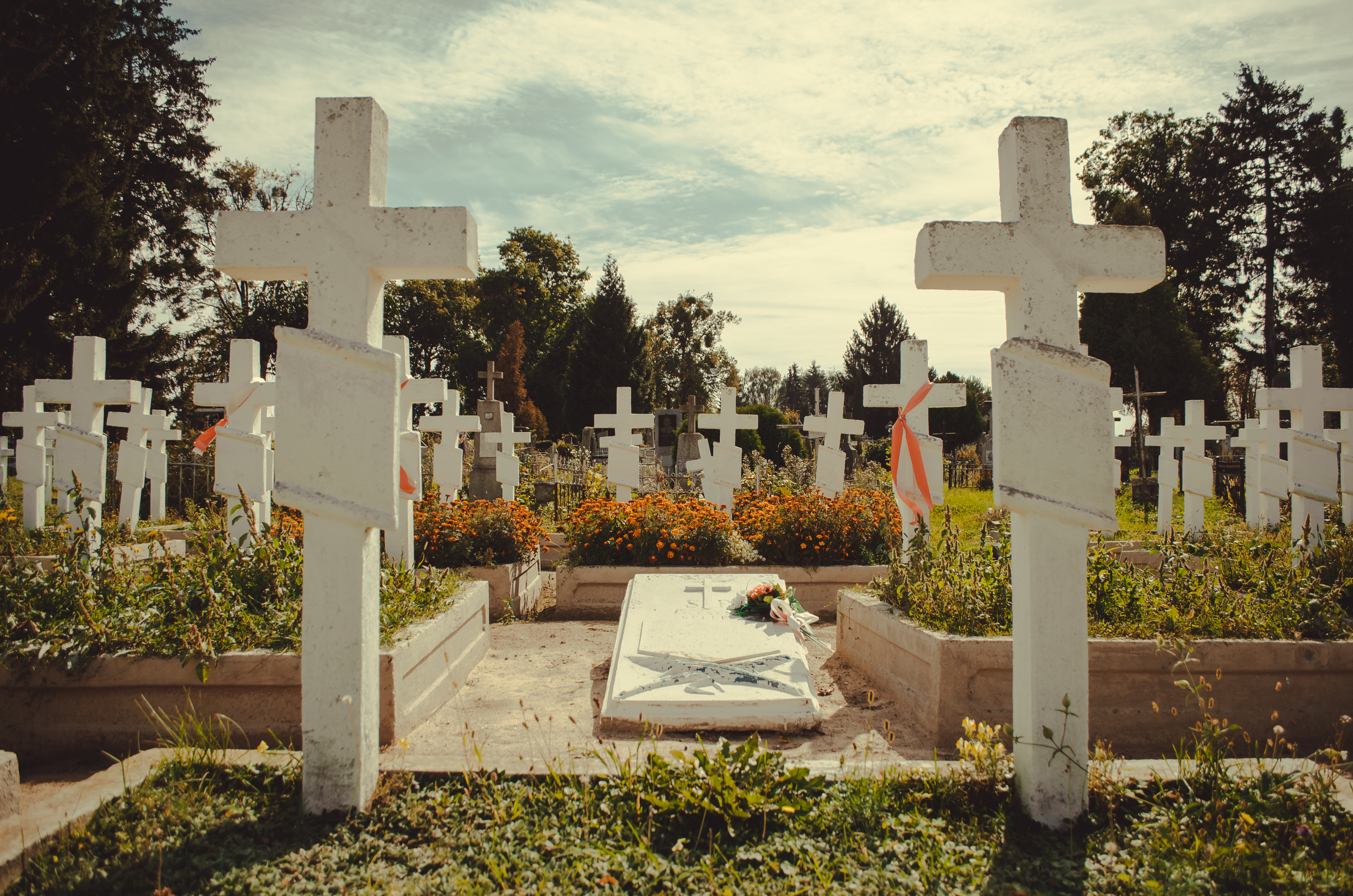
Polish military cemetery

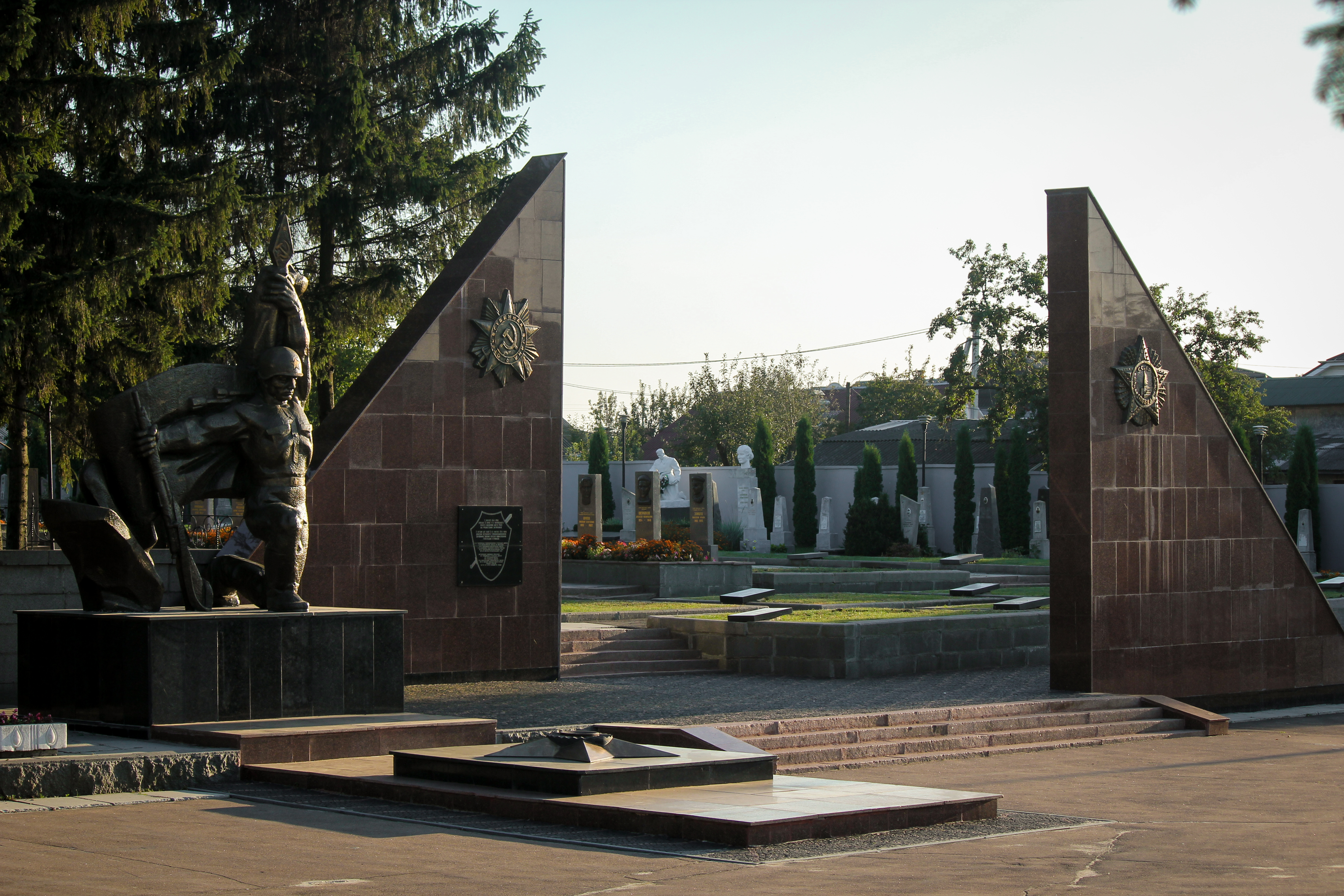
Soviet military cemetery

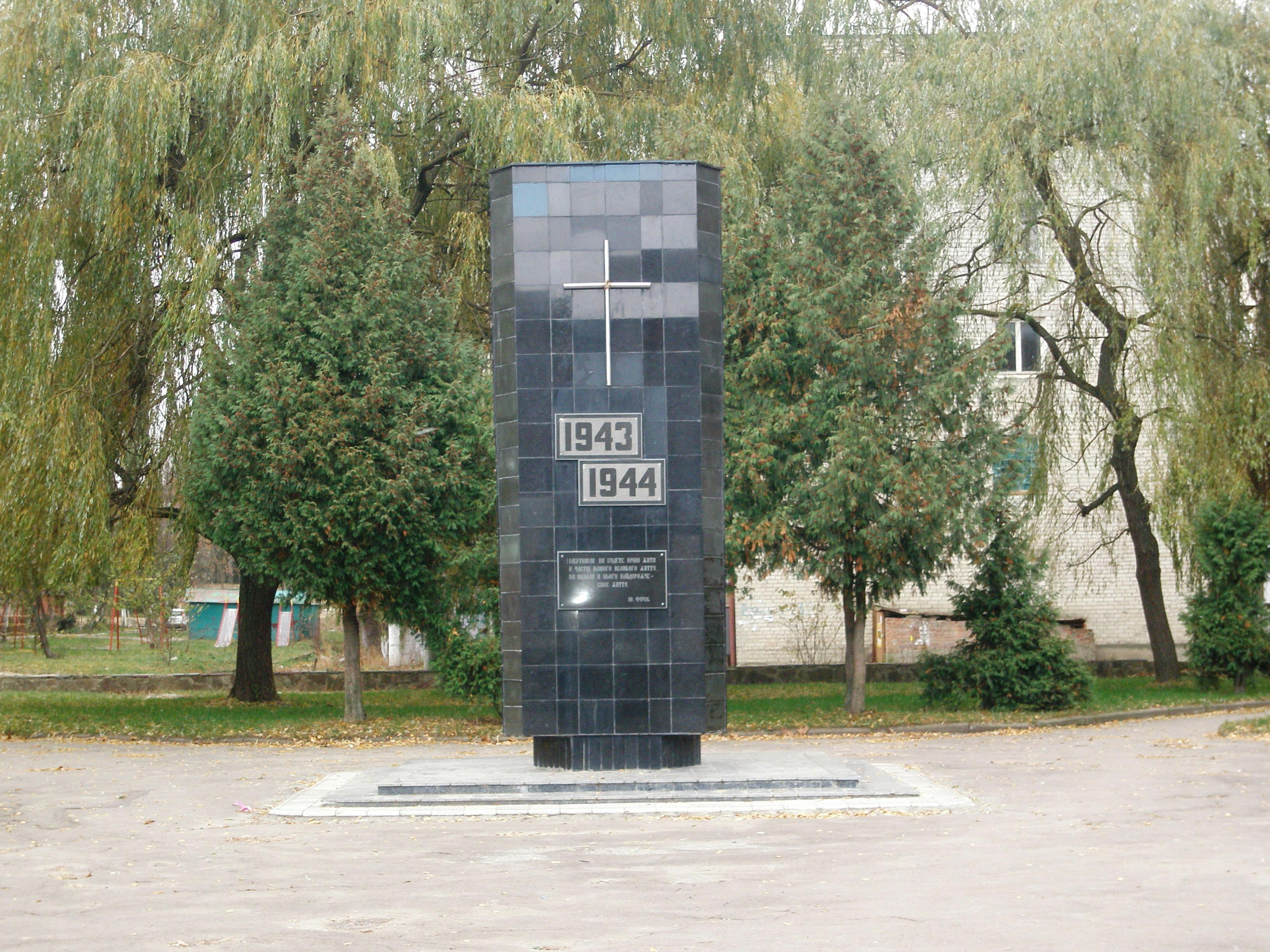
Memorial at the site of German-perpetrated mass executions of civilians

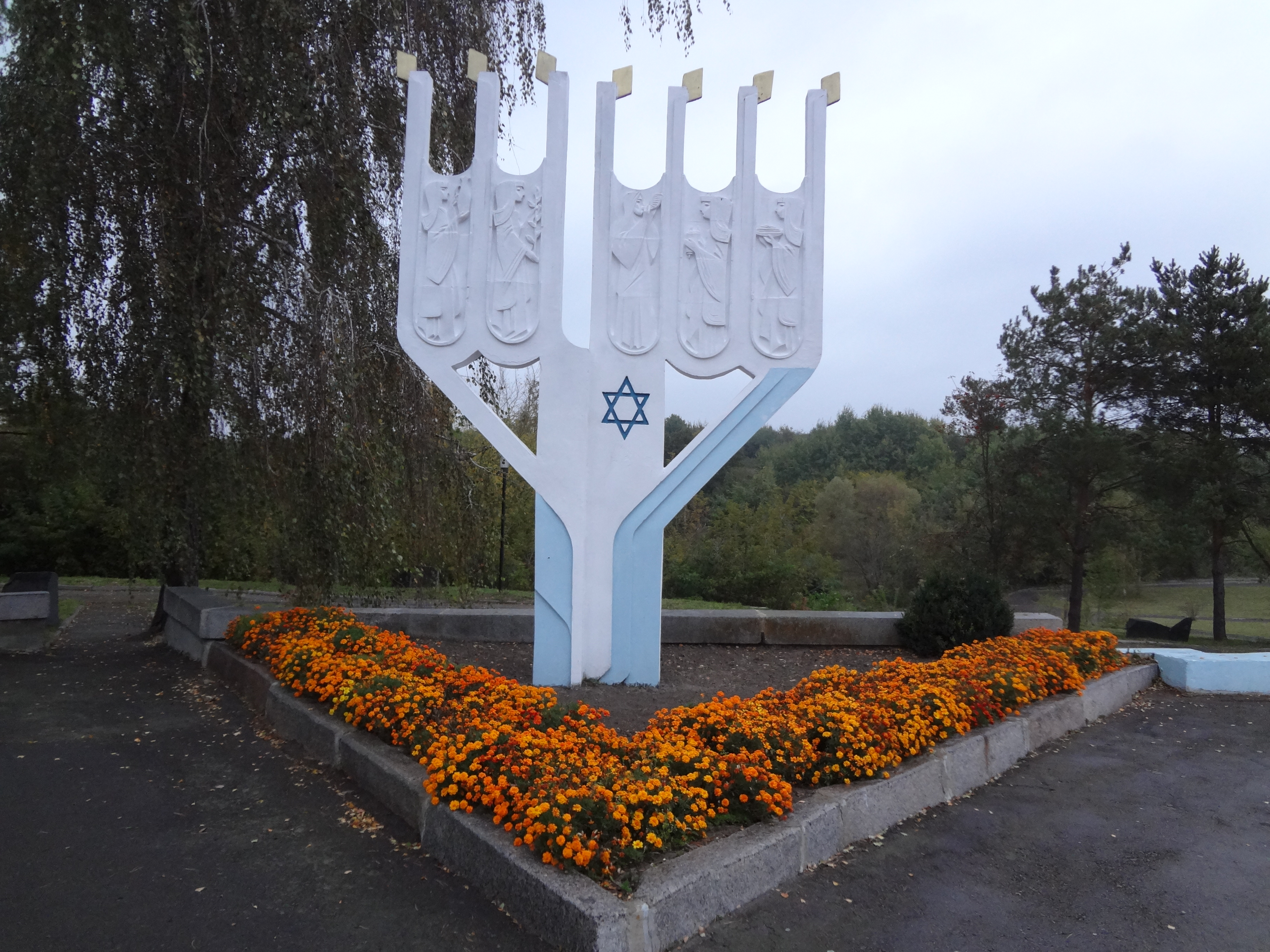
Holocaust memorial

The following memorials are found in Rivne:

- Monument to the 25th Anniversary of the Liberation of Rivne from the Fascists, Mlynivs'ke Highway
- Monument to the Victims of Fascism, Bila Street Square (1968, by A.I. Pirozhenko and B.V. Rychkov, architect-V.M.Gerasimenko)
- Bust on the Tomb of Partisan M. Strutyns'ka and Relief on the Tomb of Citizens S. Yelentsia and S. Kotiyevs'koho, Kniazia Volodymyra Street, Hrabnyk Cemetery
- Monument to the Perished of Ukraine, Magdeburz'koho Prava Plaza
- Communal Grave of Warriors, Soborna Street
- Monument of Eternal Glory, Kyivs'ka Street
- Monument to Taras Shevchenko, T.G. Shevchenko Park; Statue on Nezalezhnosti Plaza
- Memorial to Warriors' Glory, Dubens'ka Street, Rivne Military Cemetery (1975, by M.L. Farina, architect-N.A. Dolgansky)
- Monument to the Warrior and the Partisan, Peremohy Plaza (1948 by I.Ya. Matveenko)
- Monument to Colonel Klym Savura, Commander of the Ukrainian People's Army, Soborna Street
- Monument to Symon Petliura, Symon Petliura Street
- Monument to N.I. Kuznetsov (bronze and granite, 1961 by V.P Vinaikin)
- In 1992, a 20,000-square-metre (4.9-acre) memorial complex was established at the site of the World War II massacre to commemorate the 17,500 Jews murdered there in November 1941 during the Holocaust, marking the mass grave with an obelisk inscribed in Yiddish, Hebrew and Ukrainian. On 6 June 2012, the World War II Jewish burial site was vandalised, as part of an antisemitic attack.
- Monument to the victims of the Chernobyl disaster, Simon Petliura Street
- Statue and Plaza dedicated to Maria Rivnens'ka, Soborna Street

=== Popular culture references ===
- In his memoir A Tale of Love and Darkness, Israeli author Amos Oz describes Rivne through the memories of his mother and her family, who grew up in the city before emigrating to Israel in the 1930s.
- Rivne was mentioned several times in The Tale of the Nightly Neighbors, a 1992 episode of the Canadian-American TV show Are You Afraid of the Dark?, being referred to by a variation of its pre-1991 name (either Ravno or Rovno).
- In Leonard Bernstein's operetta Candide, the character of The Old Lady sings an aria "I am easily assimilated", in which she refers to her father having been born in Rovno Gubernya

== Sport ==
=== Rugby ===
- RC Rivne (1999)

=== Speedway ===
The Rivne Speedway Stadium hosts the speedway club Rivne Speedway.

The stadium opened on 24 May 1959. The venue has hosted significant speedway events including a qualifying round of the Speedway World Championship in 1962. and 1991.

== Notable people ==
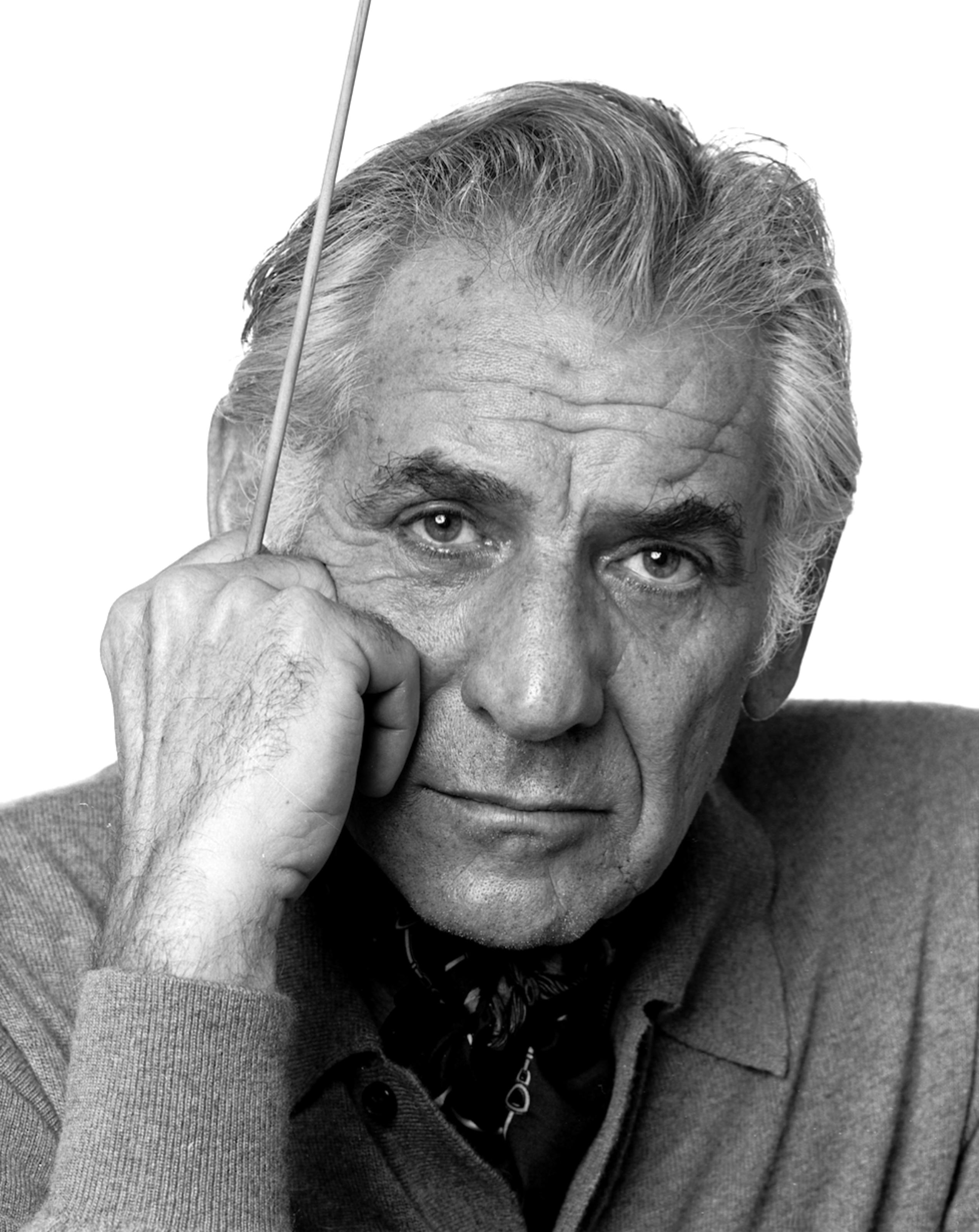
Leonard Bernstein, 1977

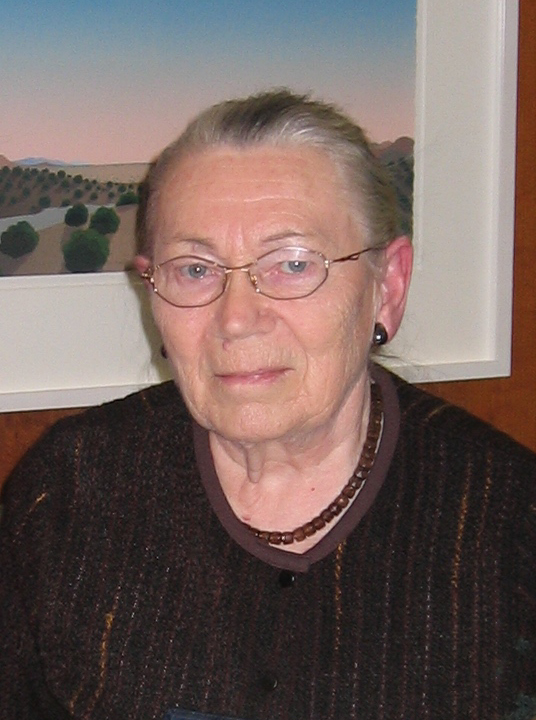
Anna Walentynowicz, 2005

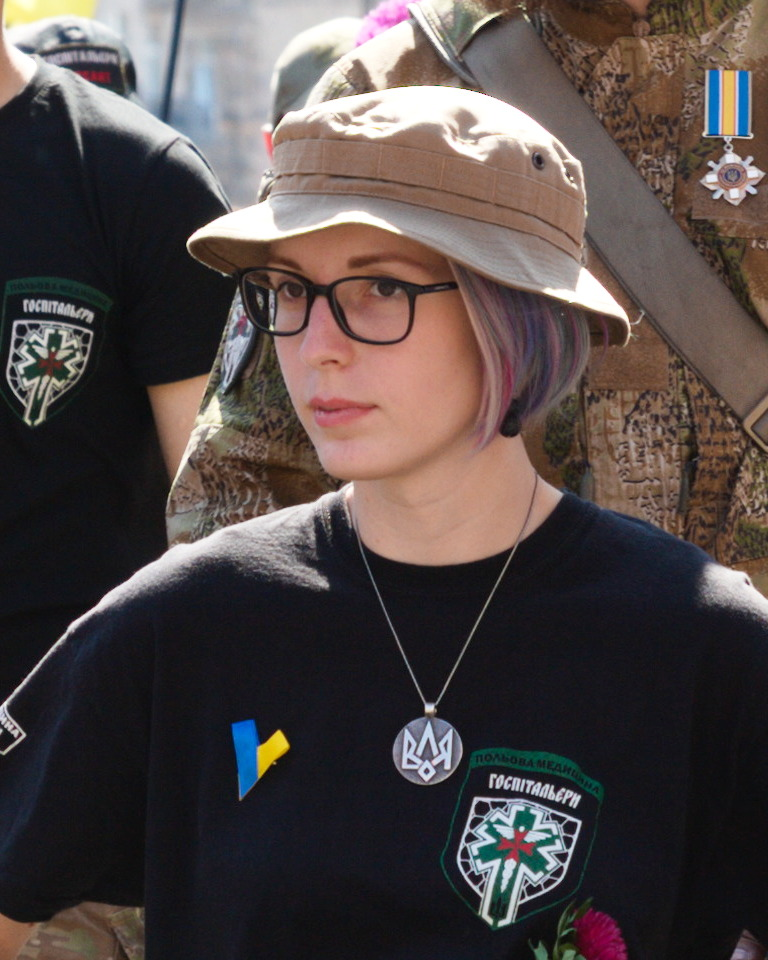
Yana Zinkevych, 2019

Yuriy Lutsenko, 2018

- Anna Belfer-Cohen (born 1949), Israeli archaeologist and paleoanthropologist
- Dahn Ben-Amotz (1924–1989), Israeli radio broadcaster, journalist, playwright and author
- Ancestors of Leonard Bernstein (1918–1990), the American composer include his father, Samuel, who was born in Berezdiv and his mother, Jennie, born in Sheptevoka in the Rovno region. In Bernstein's operetta Candide, the character of The Old Lady sings an aria, "I am easily assimilated", in which she refers to her father as having been born in Rovno Gubernya
- Zuzanna Ginczanka,(1917–1945), Polish poet of the interwar period.
- Erast Huculak (1930–2013), Canadian businessman, public figure and philanthropist
- Artem Kachanovskyi (born 1992), 2-dan professional Go player, three-time European Champion, Editor-in-chief of the European Go Journal.
- Jan Kobylański (1923–2019), Polish-Paraguayan businessman, founder of the Union of Polish Associations and Organizations in Latin America
- Olga Kulchynska (born 1990), Ukrainian soprano opera singer
- Sophie Irene Loeb (1876–1929), American journalist and social welfare advocate
- Yuriy Lutsenko (born 1964), politician and Prosecutor General of Ukraine, 2016 to 2019
- Oksana Markarova (born 1976), Minister of Finance, 2018 to 2020 and diplomat
- Nazar Nebozhynskyi (1999–2022), Ukrainian athlete, soldier, Hero of Ukraine
- Natalya Pasichnyk (born 1971), Swedish-Ukrainian classical pianist, she lives in Stockholm
- Olga Pasichnyk (born 1968), Polish-Ukrainian classical soprano singer, she lives in Poland
- Both parents of the Argentinian poet Alejandra Pizarnik (1936-1972) emigrated from Rivne to Buenos Aires in 1934
- Stanisław Albrecht Radziwiłł (1914–1976) Polish nobleman, a scion of the House of Radziwiłł
- Shmuel Shoresh (1913–1981), Israeli politician, member of the Knesset from 1955 until 1969
- Boris Smolar (1897–1986), American journalist and newspaper editor
- Mira Spivak (born 1934), member of the Senate of Canada representing Manitoba
- Anna Walentynowicz (1929–2010), Polish free trade union activist and co-founder of Solidarity
- Brenda Weisberg (1900–1996), Russian-American screenwriter of monster movies, thrillers & family films
- Wladimir Wertelecki (born 1936), pediatrician, medical geneticist and teratologist in the US
- Anatolii Yarovyi, lawyer
- Yaroslav Yevdokimov (1946–2025), baritone singer.
- Vsevolod Zaderatsky (1891–1953), Russian Imperial and Ukrainian Soviet composer, pianist and teacher
- Yana Zinkevych (born 1995), Ukrainian member of parliament and military veteran
- Moishe Zilberfarb (1876-1934), Ukrainian politician, diplomat, and public activist
- Maksym Kryvtsov (1990–2024), Ukrainian poet, public figure, volunteer, soldier of the Armed Forces of Ukraine, and participant in the Russian-Ukrainian war
- Grygorii Tsekhmistrenko (1994–2023), Canadian civic activist, volunteer medic of Ukrainian origin, soldier of the International Legion of the Armed Forces of Ukraine, participant of the Russian-Ukrainian war

=== Sport ===
- Serhiy Honchar (born 1970), professional road racing cyclist
- Serhiy Lishchuk (born 1982), basketball player, Valencia BC legend, nicknamed "the Ukraine Train"
- Mykhailo Romanchuk (born 1996), swimmer, silver & bronze medallst at the 2020 Summer Olympics
- Viktor Trofimov (1938–2013), former Soviet international speedway rider
- Alla Tsuper (born 1979), Ukrainian and Belarusian aerial skier and gold medallist at the 2014 Winter Olympics
- Ancestors of Demian Maia (born 1977), UFC Fighter, BJJ Champion and ADCC Champion. His grandfather Stefan Szwec came from Rovno, village of Shpaniv to Brazil in 1926. Demian Maia’s grandmother, Eugenia Kirilchuk, also came from Rovno region.

== International relations ==
=== Twin towns – Sister cities ===
Rivne is twinned with:

- East Brunswick in the United States
- Essen in Germany
- Federal Way in the United States
- Fredrikstad in Norway
- Gdańsk in Poland
- Jelenia Góra in Poland
- Kobuleti in Georgia
- Kupiansk in Ukraine
- Lublin in Poland
- Lund in Sweden
- Monaco
- Oberviechtach in Germany
- Olsztyn in Poland
- Pankow in Germany
- Piotrków Trybunalski in Poland
- Radomsko County in Poland
- Sievierodonetsk in Ukraine
- Vidin in Bulgaria
- Zabrze in Poland
- Zvolen in Slovakia

== See also ==
- Rivne Ukrainian Gymnasium

== Maps ==
- (in Ukrainian) Рівне, план міста, 1:12000. Міста України. Картографія.
- infomisto.com — map of the Rivne, information and reference portal.
