= Olga Nazarova (disambiguation) =

Olga Nazarova (born 1965) is a Russian 400 metre runner.

Olga Nazarova may also refer to:

- Olga Nazarova (biathlete) (born 1977), Russian-born Belarusian biathlete
- Olga Nazarova (hurdler) (born 1962), Russian hurdler
