= Nazar Nebozhynskyi =

Ukrainian athlete, soldier

- Назар Небожинський
- Born: Nazar Volodymyrovych Nebozhynskyi; 23 January 1999; Rivne
- Died: 30 March 2022 (aged 23); Chernihiv Oblast
- Military career
- Allegiance: Ukraine
- Branch: Armed Forces of Ukraine
- Rank: Junior sergeant
- Conflicts: Russo-Ukrainian War
- Awards: Hero of Ukraine

Nazar Volodymyrovych Nebozhynskyi (Ukrainian: Назар Володимирович Небожинський, 23 January 1999, Rivne – 30 March 2022, Chernihiv Oblast) was a Ukrainian athlete, soldier, junior sergeant of the Armed Forces of Ukraine, and a participant of the Russian-Ukrainian war. Hero of Ukraine (2023).

== Biography ==
Nazar Nebozhynskyi was born on 23 January 1999 in Rivne. Nebozhynskyi played baseball. He was a baseball and softball coach.

He studied at the Rivne educational complex "Collegium". In 2016, he entered the National University of Water and Environmental Engineering. After graduation, he voluntarily joined the Armed Forces of Ukraine.

On 30 March 2022, in Chernihiv Oblast, Junior Sergeant Nazar Nebozhynskyi, an infantry fighting vehicle gunner, shot down three enemy "armor", but the last gun managed to work and fatally wounded him. Thus, at the cost of his own life, he saved 20 of his comrades.

Nazar Nebozhynskyi was buried on 4 April 2022 on the Alley of Heroes at the Nove Cemetery in Rivne.

== Awards ==
- Hero of Ukraine with the Order "Golden Star" (29 September 2023, posthumously)
- Order for Courage, III class (20 April 2022, posthumously)

== Commemorating the memory ==
One of Rivne's streets is named after Nazar Nebozhynskyi.
