= Nazar Yeroshenko =

Ukrainian footballer (born 2003)

Personal information
- Full name: Nazar Volodymyrovych Yeroshenko
- Date of birth: 3 July 2003 (age 23)
- Place of birth: Kremenchuk, Ukraine
- Position: Goalkeeper

Youth career
- 2016-2018: Kremin Academy

Senior career*
Years	Team	Apps	(Gls)
2019–2020	Kremin-Yunior	1	(0)
- * Club domestic league appearances and goals as of 20 September 2023

Nazar Yeroshenko (Ukrainian: Назар Володимирович Єрошенко; born 3 July 2003) is a Ukrainian footballer who played as a goalkeeper for Ukrainian club Kremin-Yunior.

== Early life ==
Nazar Yeroshenko was born on 3 July 2003, in Kremenchuk, Ukraine. He joined Kremin Academy where he trained under Anton Dyndikov. During the summer 2014 Yeroshenko was selected as the best goalkeeper in a beach football competition with Kremin, who finished fifth.

== Career ==
=== Kremin-Yunior ===
Yeroshenko signed for Kremin-Yunior that was planning to participate in 2019–20 Ukrainian Football Amateur League. He made his debut in a 4:0 loss to Motor. Yeroshenko replaced Oleh Lashko on sixty-ninth minute. He conceded a penalty kick from Dmytro Plakhtyr. While training with Kremin-Yunior, Yeroshenko continued playing for Kremin U-17 in the. He featured in nine matches and conceded sixteen goals.

=== Advocat and Co ===
Yeroshenko played for futsal club Advocat and Co in 2021.

== Military Service ==
With Russian invasion of Ukraine Yeroshenko volunteered for military service. He served in Zaporizhzhia Oblast, Kherson Oblast and Donetsk Oblast. He was also serving near Bakhmut. There on 24 November 2022 hew received multiple wounds to his legs. After undergoing an operation in Dnipro, he was sent to a hospital in Kyiv for rehabilitation.

== Career statistics ==
As of 20 September 2023

Appearances and goals by club, season and competition
Club	Season	League			Cup		Other		Total	
Club	Season	Division	Apps	Goals	Apps	Goals	Apps	Goals	Apps	Goals
Kremin-Yunior	2019–20	Amateur Championship	1	0	—		—		1	0
Career total			1	0	0	0	0	0	1	0
