= Rovné, Svidník District =

Rovné
- Municipality
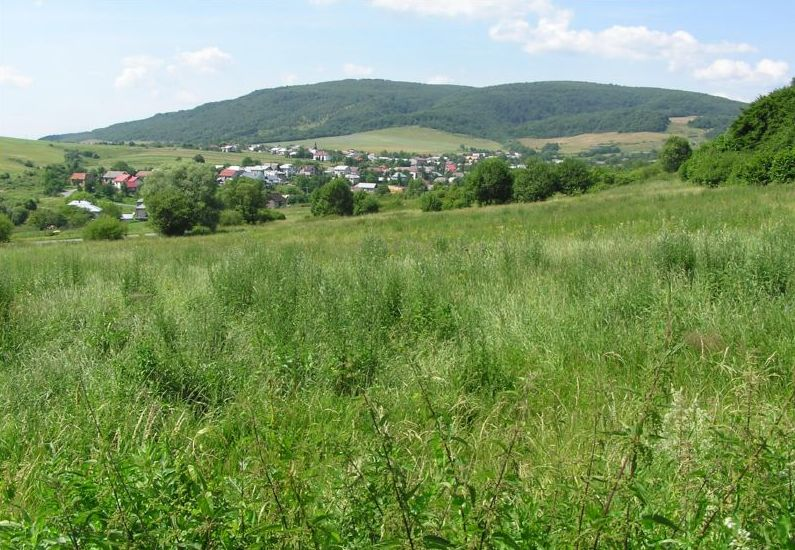

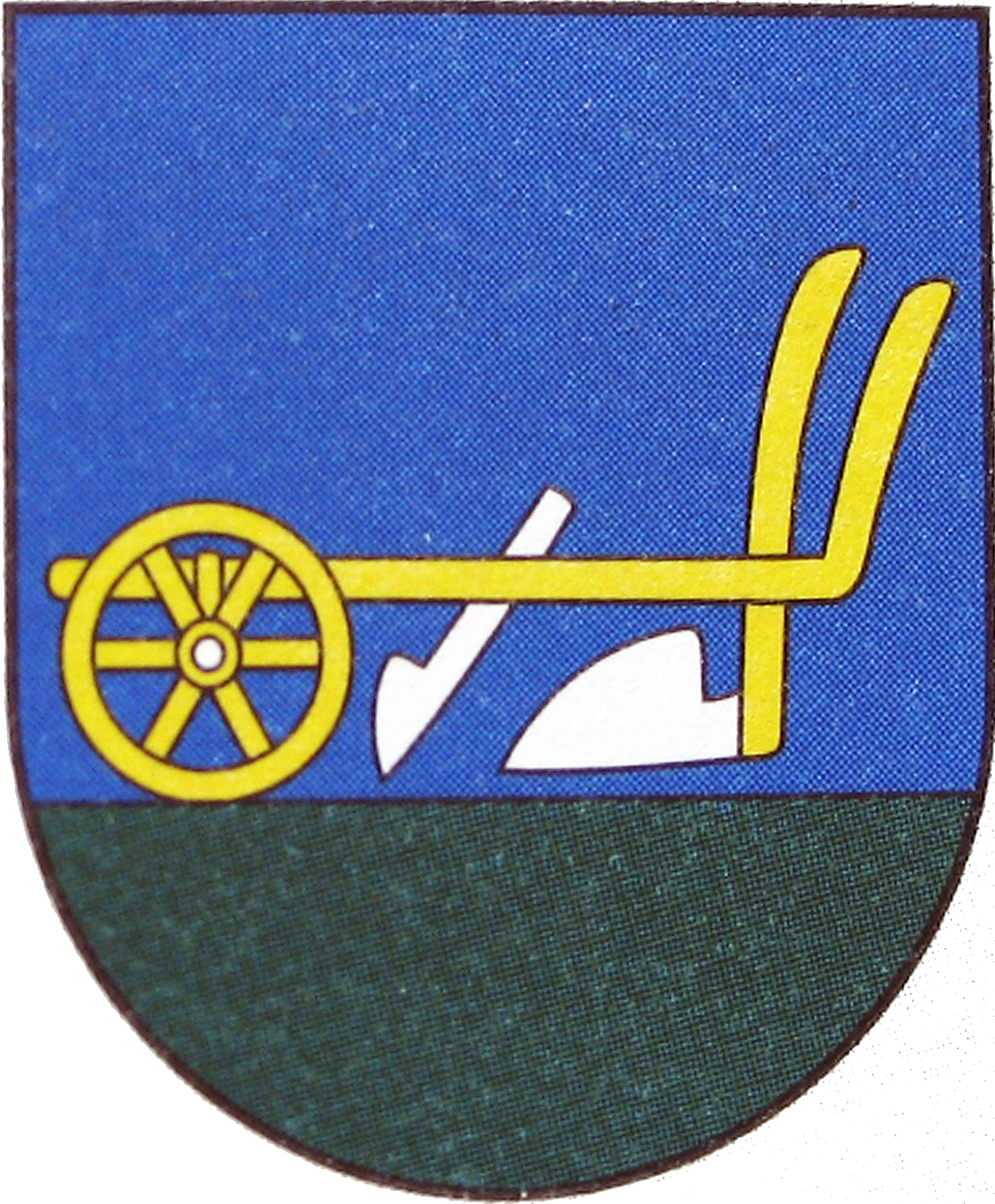
- Flag Coat of arms

- Location of Rovné in the Prešov Region Location of Rovné in Slovakia
- Coordinates: 49°17′N 21°31′E
- Country: Slovakia
- Region: Prešov Region
- District: Svidník District
- First mentioned: 1414

Area
  - Total: 13.02 km^{2} (5.03 sq mi)
- Elevation: 356 m (1,168 ft)

Population (2025)
  - Total: 458
- Time zone: UTC+1 (CET)
  - Summer (DST): UTC+2 (CEST)
- Postal code: 901 6
- Area code: +421 57
- Vehicle registration plate (until 2022): SK
- Website: www.obecrovne.eu

Rovné (Hungarian: Róna, until 1899: Rovnó) is a village and municipality in Svidník District in the Prešov Region of north-eastern Slovakia.

== History ==
In historical records the village was first mentioned in 1414.

== Geography ==
The municipality lies at an altitude of 356 metres (1,168 ft) and covers an area of 13.02 km^{2} (5.03 sq mi) (2025).

== Population ==
Population statistic (10 years)
Year	1995	2005	2015	2025
Count	510	512	489	458
Difference		+0.39%	−4.49%	−6.33%

Population statistic
Year	2024	2025
Count	456	458
Difference		+0.43%

It has a population of 458 people (31 December 2025).

=== Ethnicity ===
Census 2021 (1+ %)
Ethnicity	Number	Fraction
Slovak	408	85.35%
Rusyn	220	46.02%
Romani	66	13.8%
Not found out	16	3.34%
Total	478	

In year 2021 was 478 people by ethnicity 408 as Slovak, 220 as Rusyn, 66 as Romani, 16 as Not found out, 2 as Ukrainian, 2 as Polish and 1 as Czech.

Note on population: The difference values of population numbers in the table "Population statistic" and in the sections "Ethnicity" & "Religion" is caused by the use of various statistical methods.

=== Religion ===
Census 2021 (1+ %)
Religion	Number	Fraction
Greek Catholic Church	372	77.82%
Roman Catholic Church	47	9.83%
Eastern Orthodox Church	28	5.86%
None	16	3.35%
Not found out	12	2.51%
Total	478	

In year 2021 was 478 people by religion 372 from Greek Catholic Church, 47 from Roman Catholic Church, 28 from Eastern Orthodox Church, 16 from None, 12 from Not found out, 2 from Evangelical Church and 1 from Ad hoc movements.
