= Nazar Aqa Yamin ol-Saltaneh =

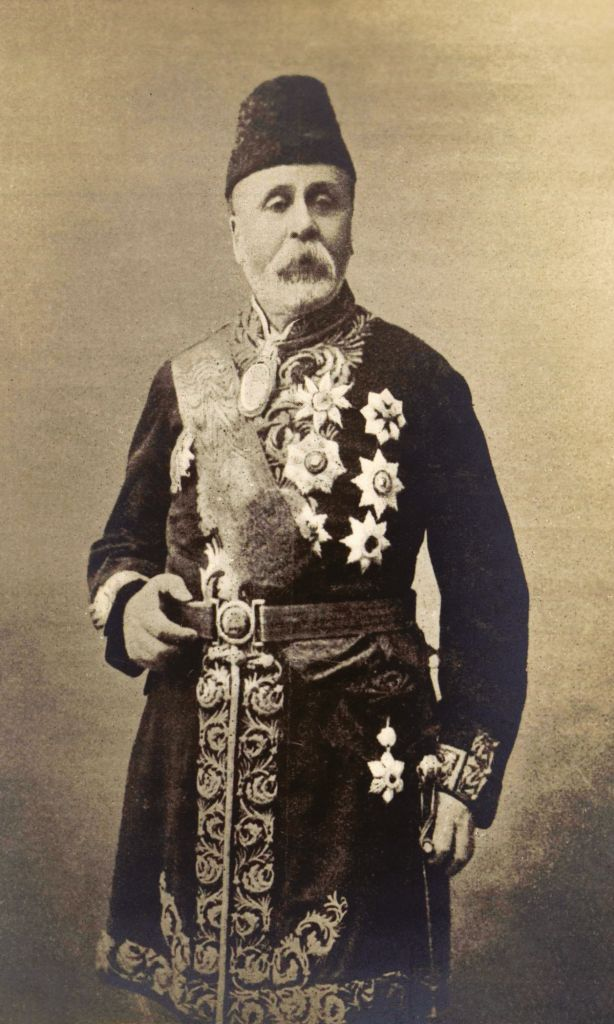
- Photograph of Nazar Aqa Yamin ol-Saltaneh, dated 1902

Personal details
- Born: 1817 Urmia, Qajar Iran
- Died: 20th century

Nazar Aqa Yamin ol-Saltaneh (Persian: نظرآقا یمین‌السلطنه) was an Iranian diplomat who served as the ambassador to France from 1873/74 to 1904/05.

== Background ==
Nazar Aqa was born in 1817 in Urmia. According to the British-American historian Hamid Algar, Nazar Aqa was of Assyrian origin. However, the American historian Daniel T. Potts, citing the contemporary French writers Edmé-Casimir de Croizier and René François Rohrbacher, state that his father was a Polish émigré and his mother was a Chaldean named Rachel. Nazar Aqa had two brothers, including Borzu Khan, an artillery colonel. Nazar Aqa was a follower of the Catholic Church. During his youth, he studied in the Lazarist school in Constantinople.

== Career ==
After finishing his education, Nazar Aqa worked as a teacher at the Dar al-Fonun school in Tehran. In 1854/54, he briefly worked in Tbilisi as a translator at the Iranian embassy. He was subsequently sent to work as the second translator of Abbasqoli Khan Seyf ol-Molk at the Iranian embassy in Saint Petersburg.

In 1866/67, Nazar Aqa started working in the Ministry of Foreign Affairs. In 1869/70, Nazar Aqa was appointed as the chargé d'affaires of the Iranian embassy in Paris, thus succeeding Yousuf Khan Mostashar al-Dowleh. In 1873/74, Nazar Aqa was appointed as the Iranian ambassador to France. Because Nazar Aqa was Catholic, and because his selection signaled Naser al-Din Shah's intention to integrate Iran into a community Europeans regarded as "civilized", the decision was widely welcomed in Europe. Nazar Aqa would hold this position until 1904/05.

On 27 April 1873 Nazar Aqa left Paris to visit the 1873 Vienna World's Fair. Naser al-Din Shah, during his visit to Europe, reached Spa in Belgium on 15 June, where he was welcomed by Nazar Aqa and other Council members. On 17 June, many Iranian figures, including Nazar Aqa, was part of Naser al-Din Shah's retinue that visited Brussels. On 7 October 1875, Nazar Aqa met Pope Pius IX in Rome and gave him a letter from Naser al-Din Shah. In 1892/93, Nazar Aqa was rewarded with the title of Yamin ol-Saltaneh.

On 30 June 1896 at the Lazarist church on the Rue de Sèvres street, Nazar Aqa was present during the ceremony when François Lesné was appointed as the Archbishop of Philippopoli and Apostolic Delegat for Iran.

Nazar Aqa was married to an Armenian from his hometown.

== Sources ==
- Bamdad, Mehdi (1972). شرح حال رجال ایران در قرن ۱۲ و ۱۳ و ۱۴ هجری [Dictionary of National Biography of Iran, 1700-1960, vol. 4].
- Potts, Daniel T. (2025). Qajars and Catholics: Tehran, the Vatican and the Lazarist Mission in Iran. Brill Publishers. ISBN 978-9004754133.
