= EUROCAT (medicine) =

EUROCAT is a network of population-based congenital anomaly registries across Europe for the monitoring, surveillance and research of congenital anomalies. It was founded in 1979.

As of January 2023, the network has 43 member registries from 23 countries covering more than 25% of European births per year. The detailed registry descriptions can be found on the EUROCAT website

== Objectives ==
EUROCAT's objectives are to:

- Provide essential epidemiologic information on congenital anomalies in Europe.
- Facilitate the early warning of teratogenic exposures.
- Evaluate the effectiveness of primary prevention.
- Assess the impact of developments in prenatal screening.
- Act as an information and resource center regarding clusters or exposures or risk factors for concern.
- Provide a ready collaborative network and infrastructure for research related to the causes and prevention of congenital anomalies and the treatment and care of affected children.
- Act as a catalyst for the setting up of registries throughout Europe collecting comparable, standardised data.

== History ==
EUROCAT was founded in 1979 as the European Concerted Action on Congenital Anomalies and Twins. The EUROCAT Central Registry was based in Brussels from 1979 to 1999 and at the University of Ulster from 2000 to 2014.

In 2015 the Central Registry was transferred to the European Commission's Joint Research Centre (JRC) in Ispra, Italy, and it is now an integral part of the European Platform on Rare Disease Registration.

Leadership is provided by the JRC-EUROCAT Management Committee, comprising elected members from the EUROCAT congenital anomaly registries and representatives from the JRC.

== Methodology ==
All EUROCAT member registries use multiple sources of information to ascertain cases in live births, late fetal deaths (>20 weeks gestational age) and terminations of pregnancy for fetal anomaly at any gestational age.

EUROCAT has achieved a high level of data harmonisation and interoperability between registries through the standardisation of definitions, diagnoses and terminology, principally by the development of the EUROCAT Guides and software for data management. The EUROCAT methodology is recognized worldwide and is used by many research groups.

== JRC-EUROCAT Central Registry and the Central Database ==
The role of the JRC-EUROCAT Central Registry is (i) to maintain and further develop the EUROCAT Central Database, (ii) to ensure secure data transmission and (iii) to facilitate data management in all registries.

Data management includes data validation, data harmonization and quality assessment using validated international classification systems where possible, which are defined in the EUROCAT Guide 1.5.

Data are transmitted by individual registries to the JRC-EUROCAT Central Registry twice a year, in February and October, via a secure web-portal. The validated data included in the Central Database are used by the Central Registry to perform routine statistical analyses for epidemiological surveillance. The Central Registry also provides data for research and surveillance purposes and supports the coordination and dissemination activities of the network.

== Annual surveillance of congenital anomalies ==
One key function of EUROCAT is to publish annual statistics on prevalence and prenatal detection rates for a wide range of major congenital anomalies. The data covers all pregnancy outcomes (including terminations) from 20 weeks gestation.

The JRC-EUROCAT Central Registry also performs a statistical analysis of temporal clusters and pan-European trends in prevalence of congenital anomalies.

== See also ==
- Rare disease
