= Trisomy 8 =

- Other names: Warkany syndrome 2
- Chromosome 8
- Specialty: Medical genetics
- Symptoms: Stunted development, moderate to severe intellectual disability, height extremes, lack of facial expression, birth defects
- Complications: Rothmund–Thomson syndrome, tricho–rhino–phalangeal syndrome, chronic myeloid leukaemia
- Duration: Lifelong
- Causes: Three copies of chromosome 8
- Diagnostic method: Karyotype
- Prognosis: Usually gestationally lethal in complete form

Trisomy 8 causes Warkany syndrome 2, a human chromosomal disorder caused by having three copies (trisomy) of chromosome 8. It can appear with or without mosaicism.

== Characteristics ==
Complete trisomy 8 causes severe abnormalities in the developing fetus and can be a cause of miscarriage. Complete trisomy 8 is usually a gestational lethal condition, whereas trisomy 8 mosaicism is less severe and individuals with a low proportion of affected cells may exhibit a comparatively mild range of physical abnormalities and developmental delay. Individuals with trisomy 8 mosaicism are more likely to survive into childhood and adulthood and exhibit a characteristic and recognizable pattern of developmental abnormalities. Common findings include stunted psychomotor development, moderate to severe intellectual disability, variable growth patterns which can result in either abnormally short or tall stature, an expressionless face, and many musculoskeletal, visceral, and eye abnormalities, as well as other anomalies. A deep plantar furrow is considered to be pathognomonic of this condition, especially when seen in combination with other associated features. The type and severity of symptoms are dependent upon the prevalence of the affected cells and their location within the body.

The short arm of chromosome 8 (8p) is known to be an evolutionary hotspot for structural rearrangements, with some genetic rearrangements reaching 31.5 Mb and containing 175 OMIM genes. Rearrangements involving 8p—including trisomies, deletions, duplications, and translocations —are highly variable in size and gene content, resulting in a wide range of neurodevelopmental and systemic phenotypes. Project 8p Foundation, a global nonprofit patient advocacy organization, supports individuals affected by chromosome 8p disorders, including 8p trisomies, through community support and connection, a longitudinal natural history study, biorepository, open-access data platform, and the development of precision medicine tools aimed at improving clinical care and accelerating discovery. There is also a multidisciplinary clinic for 8p rearrangements led by Project 8p available to affected families.

=== Other conditions ===
Trisomy 8 mosaicism affects wide areas of chromosome 8, containing many genes, and can thus be associated with several symptoms.

- Mosaic trisomy 8 has been reported in rare cases of Rothmund–Thomson syndrome, a genetic disorder associated with the DNA helicase RECQL4 on chromosome 8q24.3. The syndrome is "characterized by skin atrophy, telangiectasia, hyper- and hypopigmentation, congenital skeletal abnormalities, short stature, premature aging, and increased risk of malignant disease".
- Some individuals trisomic for chromosome 8 were deficient in production of coagulation factor VII due to a factor 7 regulation gene (F7R) mapped to 8p23.3-p23.1.
- Trisomy and other rearrangements of chromosome 8 have also been found in tricho–rhino–phalangeal syndrome.
- Small regions of chromosome 8 trisomy and monosomy are also created by recombinant chromosome 8 syndrome (San Luis Valley syndrome), causing anomalies associated with tetralogy of Fallot, which results from recombination between a typical chromosome 8 and one carrying a parental paracentric inversion.
- Trisomy is also found in some cases of chronic myeloid leukaemia, potentially as a result of karyotypic instability caused by the bcr:abl fusion gene.

== Diagnosis ==
The simplest and easiest way to detect trisomy 8 is by a karyotype, a photograph representing all chromosomes of a cell in an orderly manner. Amniocentesis is also a technique for diagnosis. Samples from the amniotic fluid are taken from a fetus, cultured, then analyzed by a karyotype. If the photograph shows 3 copies of chromosome 8 instead of 2, then the individual has trisomy 8.

== See also ==
- Warkany syndrome 1
