= Arthur Biedl =

Hungarian pathologist (1869–1933)

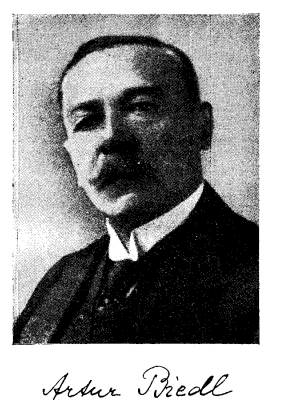
Arthur Biedl

Arthur Biedl (4 October 1869 – 26 August 1933) was a Hungarian pathologist born in what today is Comloșu Mic, Romania.

He studied medicine at the University of Vienna, and from 1893 served as an assistant to Salomon Stricker (1834–1898), Philipp Knoll (1841–1900), and Richard Paltauf (1858–1924) at the institute of experimental pathology in Vienna. In 1899, he became an associate professor, followed by a full professorship in 1902.

In 1898, Biedl and colleague R. Kraus demonstrated that "bile salts," when injected into the bloodstream of animals, failed to elicit a behavioral change. They hypothesized that this was due to a semipermeable membrane that protected the central nervous system from the passive diffusion of solutes in the bloodstream. Two years later, Max Lewandowsky coined the term "Blood–brain barrier" when these findings were confirmed with other biological compounds. Edwin Goldmann and his mentor Paul Ehrlich further confirmed these findings with aniline dyes injected inside and outside of the brain.

He is considered a founder of modern endocrinology. In 1910, Biedl published a landmark textbook on endocrinology called Innere Sekretion ("Internal Secretions"), which was a thorough study on glands and their secretions.

In 1922, he described his studies of two sisters who had retinitis pigmentosa, polydactyly, hypogonadism as well as obesity. Two years earlier, Georges Bardet (1885–1966) at the University of Paris described the same symptoms in two sisters unrelated to Biedl's findings. This syndrome is now called the Bardet–Biedl syndrome after the two men.

A similar disease was originally named the "Laurence–Moon–Bardet–Biedl syndrome", together with two English physicians, John Zachariah Laurence (1829–1870) and Robert Charles Moon (1845–1914). Today this disease has been shortened to become the Laurence–Moon syndrome, while the Bardet–Biedl syndrome is recognized as a separate entity.

In 1928, he founded the journal Endokrinologie.

== Principal works ==
- Innere Sekretion : ihre physiologischen Grundlagen und ihre Bedeutung für die Pathologie, 1910. English translation 1912. fourth edition, with an exhaustive bibliography, 1922.
- Physiologie und Pathologie der Hypophyse. Berlin, 1922.
- '"in Geschwisterpaar mit adiposo-genitaler Dystrophie". in: Deutsche medicinische Wochenschrift, Berlin, 1922, 48: 1630.
