= Biedl =

Biedl is a surname. Notable people with the surname include:

- Albrecht Biedl (born 1938), German computer scientist
- Arthur Biedl (1869–1933), Hungarian pathologist
- Artur Biedl (1904–1950), Austrian philologist
- Therese Biedl, Austrian computer scientist
