= James Hatley Frere =

British writer

James Hatley Frere (1779–1866) was an English writer on prophecy and developer of a tactile alphabet system for teaching the blind to read.

== Life ==
Frere was the sixth son of John Frere, of Roydon, South Norfolk, and Beddington, Surrey, by Jane, daughter and heiress of John Hookham of London. On 15 June 1809 he married Merian, second daughter of Matthew Martin, F.R.S., of Poets' Corner, Westminster, by whom he had six sons:

- Hatley Frere (1811–1868), Judge of the High Court, Madras (great-grandfather of Mary Leakey)
- Chales Frere (1813–1884), Taxing Master of the House of Commons, Barrister-at-law
- John Alexander Frere (1814–1877), Vicar of Shillington, Bedfordshire
- Edward Daniel Frere (1816–1881)
- Constantine Frere (1817–1905), Rector of Finningham
- William Theodore Frere (1820–?), died as an infant.

Frere met Edward Irving in 1825, and influenced him in the direction of the study of biblical prophecy. He died at the residence of his third son, the Rev. John Alexander Frere, Shillington vicarage, Bedfordshire, on 8 December 1866.

== Inventor ==
About 1838 Frere introduced a tactile alphabet, a phonetic system for teaching the blind to read. He had the advantage of having his plan carried out by a blind man, who suggested several changes. His characters consist of straight lines, half circles, hooked lines, and angles of forty-five degrees, together with a hollow and solid circle. He also invented the 'return' lines: the lines in his book are read from left to right and from right to left alternately (boustrophedon), the letters themselves being reversed in the return lines. Although useful in enabling uneducated persons to read in a short space of time, Frere's system was found to vitiate pronunciation. In 1871 it was in use at only three home institutions.

He devised a cheap method of setting up and stereotyping his books. 'The letters, formed of copper wire, are laid on a tin plate, previously washed over with a solution of zinc; when heat is applied to the under-surface, the letter becomes soldered on to the plate, and such plates produced extremely good printing'. T. M. Lucas of Bristol and William Moon of Brighton adopted this system of stereotyping.

== Works ==
George Stanley Faber and Samuel Roffey Maitland found Frere's biblical studies of some interest. He was a premillennialist.

Aided by a Miss Yates of Fairlawn, Frere was able to have 'The Book of the Prophet Isaiah' printed from embossed metallic plates according to his stereotyping method (London, 1843–9). His other works are:

- A Combined View of the Prophecies of Daniel, Esdras, and S. John, shewing that all the prophetic writings are formed upon one plan … Also a minute explanation of the prophecies of Daniel; together with critical remarks upon the interpretations of preceding commentators, and more particularly upon the systems of Mr. Faber and Mr. Cunninghame, London, 1815 (2nd edition, same year). This book, and one of the same time by Lewis Way of the Jews' Society, argued for a change in orthodox teaching on the Second Coming. These ideas attracted the attention of Henry Drummond and led to the Albury Conference of 1826 at his home. The book identified Napoleon as a personal Antichrist.
- On the General Structure of the Apocalypse, being a brief introduction to its minute interpretation, London, 1826.
- Eight Letters on the Prophecies relating to the last times; viz. The seventh vial, the civil and ecclesiastical prophetic periods, and the type of Jericho, London, 1831.
- Three Letters on the Prophecies … in continuation of eight letters published in 1831, 8vo, London, 1833; 2nd edition, with a prefatory address, London [1859].
- The Art of Teaching to Read by Elementary Sounds, 12mo, London, 1840.
- A Letter to Lord Wharncliffe, in reply to the allegations made by the London Society for Teaching the Blind to Read, against the Phonetic Method of Instruction, London, 1843.
- "The Harvest of the Earth," prior to the vintage of wrath, considered as symbolical of the Evangelical Alliance … Also a letter to Dr. Wolff, &c., London, 1846.
- The Great Continental Revolution, marking the Expiration of the Times of the Gentiles, A.D. 1847–8. In reply to a Letter from a Member of a Society of Prophetic Students. To which is added a Reprint of a Letter addressed to the Rev. Dr. Wolff on the expiration of the Times of the Gentiles A.D. 1847, and of other occasional papers, illustrative of the present period, London, 1848.
- Preface to the Second Edition of the Great Continental Revolution, containing Remarks on the progress of Prophetic Events during the year 1848–9, London, 1849 (printed separately, for the convenience of purchasers of the first edition).
- Notes, forming a brief Interpretation of the Apocalypse, London, 1850.
- Directions for Teaching the Blind to Read on the Phonetic Principle, [London, 1851].
- Grammar [embossed] for the Blind on the Principle of the Combination of Elementary Sounds, London, 1851.
