= Bardet =

Bardet is a French surname. Notable people with the surname include:

- Anne-Lise Bardet (born 1969), French slalom canoeist
- Gaston Bardet (1907–1989), French architect
- Georges Bardet (1885–?), French physician
- Jean Bardet (born 1941), French politician
- Roger Bardet, French resistance operative
- Roland Bardet, Swiss slalom canoeist
- Romain Bardet (born 1990), French racing cyclist
