= Stefan Rosental =

Polish neurologist and psychiatrist

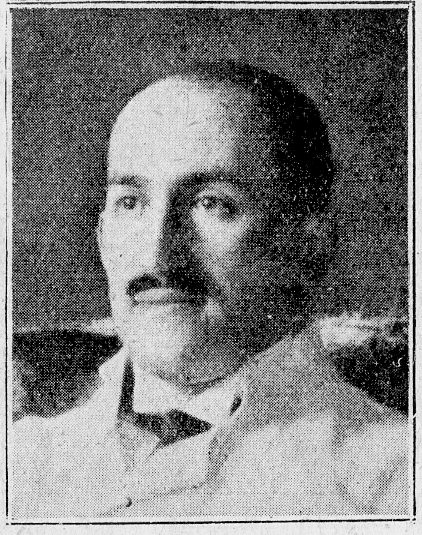
- Born: January 6, 1886; Warsaw
- Died: November 9, 1917 (aged 31); Moscow
- Education: Humboldt University of Berlin
- Occupations: Neurologist, psychiatrist
- Father: Albert Rosental

Stefan Rosental (born 6 January 1886 in Warsaw, died 9 November 1917 in Moscow) was a Polish neurologist and psychiatrist.

== Biography ==
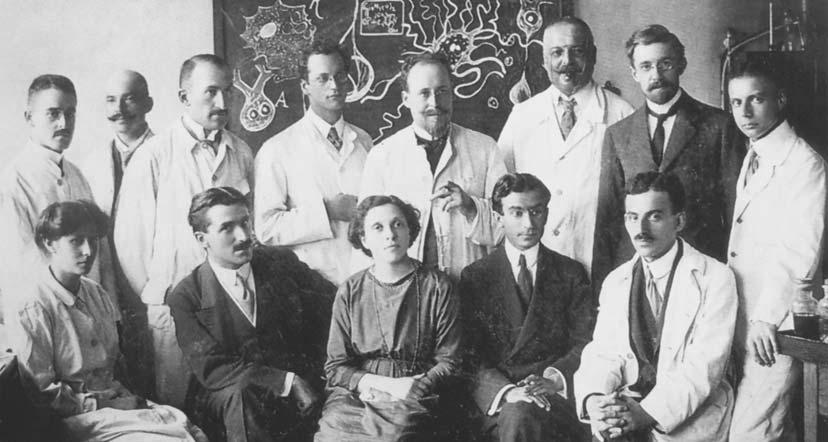
Stefan Rosental (third from the left in the second row) among Alzheimer's colleagues, Munich, 1909 or 1910

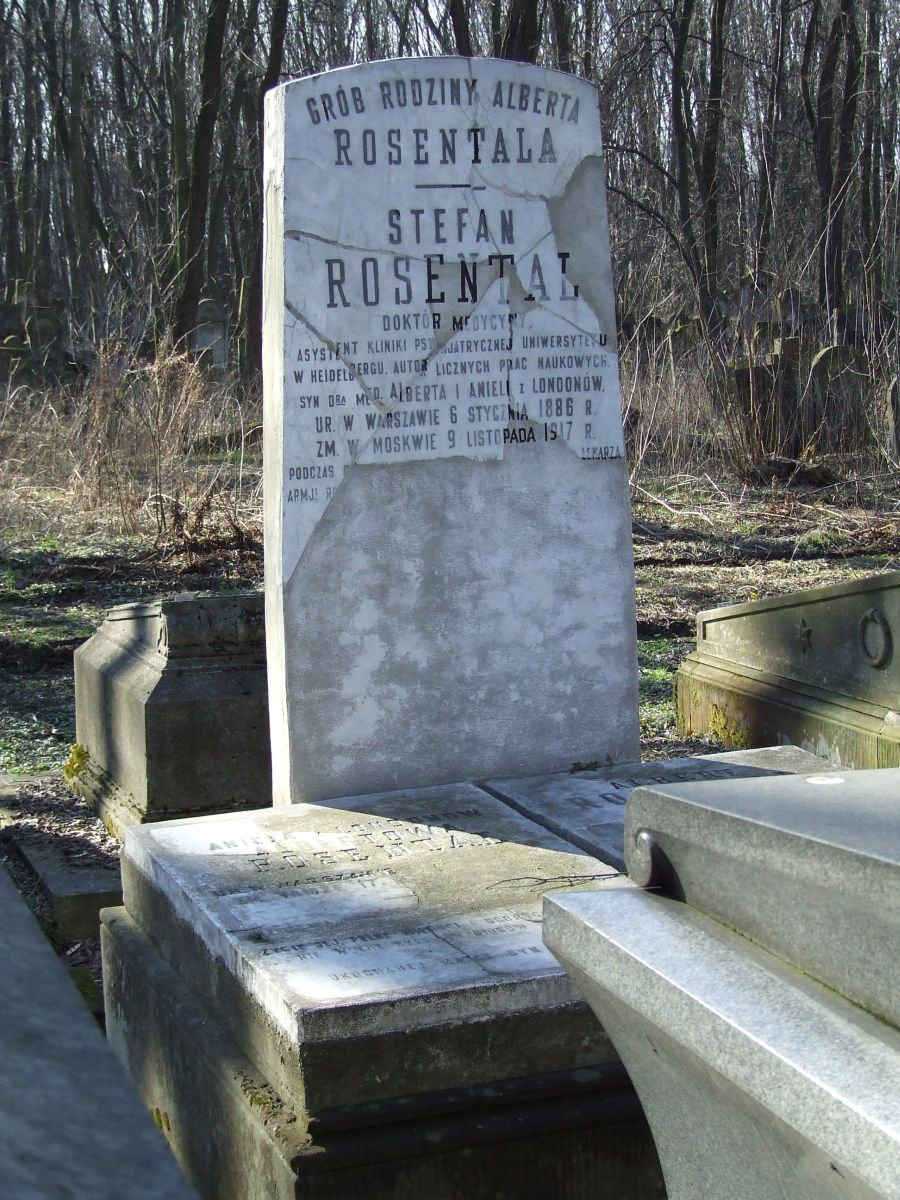
Symbolic grave of Stefan Rosental at the Jewish Cemetery on Okopowa Street in Warsaw

Rosental was born in Warsaw into a Jewish family, the son of psychiatrist Albert Rosental (1857–1921) and Aniela née London. He had a younger brother, Tadeusz (1888–after 1938). He lived with his parents in the building of the St. John Hospital on Bonifraterska Street. He graduated from IV Gymnasium in Warsaw in 1903 and began studies in the mathematics department at the University of Warsaw. After one semester, he switched to medicine, but in 1905, the university was closed, and Rosental continued his studies at the University of Wrocław. He later studied at the University of Göttingen and the Heidelberg University. He earned his doctorate in medicine from the Humboldt University of Berlin in 1909, with his dissertation supervised by Theodor Ziehen.

In 1910, he had his degree recognized at the Odesa University, after which he worked as a ship's doctor, traveling to Egypt and Syria. On his return, he spent six months in Vienna working at the Institute of General and Experimental Pathology under Richard Paltauf and at the Psychiatry and Neurology Clinic under Arthur Biedl and Julius Wagner-Jauregg. He then spent two years at the Anatomical Laboratory of the Psychiatric Clinic at the Ludwig-Maximilians-Universität München, studying under Alois Alzheimer. In December 1912, he gave a presentation at the Second Congress of Polish Neurologists, Psychiatrists, and Psychologists in Kraków.

In July 1914, he became a volunteer assistant (Volontärassistent) at the psychiatric clinic in Heidelberg, directed by Franz Nissl. Shortly thereafter, he was mobilized into the Russian army as a doctor. He initially served on the Grodno evacuation commission and, from 1915, worked in the interior of Russia, in Petersburg and Moscow. He died on 9 November 1917 in Moscow due to an infectious disease, with news of his death confirmed three months later. He was buried at the Dorogomilovo Cemetery in the Dorogomilovo district of Moscow. A symbolic grave is located at the Jewish Cemetery on Okopowa Street in Warsaw.

An obituary for Rosental appeared in Allgemeine Zeitschrift für Psychiatrie.

== Scientific contributions ==
Rosental's scientific output includes about 20 works in Polish and German, the last of which was published posthumously, unfinished. His early works focused on psychopathology: his doctoral dissertation addressed delusions in the context of melancholia. Subsequent works explored the use of serological methods in psychiatry; he published a study on the composition of blood in patients with epilepsy, as well as on the application of the so-called Abderhalden method. His oeuvre includes case studies, such as a description of idiopathic intracranial hypertension and acute lethal catatonia. He was interested in the relationship between skull capacity and brain weight in mental disorders. While working with Nissl, he focused on studying glia and its changes in the course of schizophrenia.

== List of works ==
- "O rozpoznaniu anatomicznem psychoz organicznych (Z demonstracyą preparatów)" [On the Anatomical Diagnosis of Organic Psychoses (With a Demonstration of Specimens)]. Medycyna i Kronika Lekarska (in Polish). 43 (31): 773–774. 1908.
- Die Wahnbildung bei der Melancholie [Delusion Formation in Melancholia] (in German). Berlin: G. Schade. 1909.
- "Uczucie zmiany osobowości w symptomatologii melancholii" [The Feeling of Personality Change in the Symptomatology of Melancholia]. Medycyna i Kronika Lekarska (in Polish). 44 (47): 1143–1150. 1909.
- "Das Verhalten der antiproteolytischen Substanzen im Blutserum bei der Epilepsie" [The Behavior of Antiproteolytic Substances in Blood Serum in Epilepsy]. Zeitschrift für die gesamte Neurologie und Psychiatrie (in German). 3 (1): 588–624. 1910. doi:10.1007/BF02893614.
- "Histologische Befunde beim sog. Pseudotumor cerebri" [Histological Findings in So-Called Pseudotumor Cerebri]. Zeitschrift für die gesamte Neurologie und Psychiatrie (in German). 7 (1): 163–179. 1911. doi:10.1007/BF02865137.
- "O zachowaniu się w padaczce ciał antyproteololitycznych surowicy krwi. Autoreferat" [On the Behavior of Anti-Proteolytic Bodies in the Blood Serum in Epilepsy. Author's Abstract]. Medycyna i Kronika Lekarska (in Polish). 11. 1911.
- "Die Hemiplegien ohne anatomischen Befund" [Hemiplegias Without Anatomical Findings]. Zeitschrift für die gesamte Neurologie und Psychiatrie (in German). 5 (2–3): 225. 1912.
- "Eine Verstimmung mit Wandertrieb und Beziehungswahn" [A Mood Disorder with Compulsive Wandering and Delusional Ideas of Reference]. Jahrbücher für Psychiatrie und Neurologie (in German). 32 (3): 330–358. 1911.
- "Badania doświadczalne nad przeistoczeniem ameboidalnym neuroglii (Referat)" [Experimental Studies on the Amoeboid Transformation of Neuroglia (Report)]. Medycyna i Kronika Lekarska (in Polish). 47 (30): 610. 1912.
- "Zur Frage der Schädelkapazitätsbestimmung (Referat)" [On the Question of Determining Cranial Capacity (Report)]. Allgemeine Zeitschrift für Psychiatrie und ihre Grenzgebiete (in German). 71: 330–331. 1914.
- "Über einen schizophrenen Prozeß im Gefolge einer hirndrucksteigernden Erkrankung" [On a Schizophrenic Process Following a Condition Increasing Intracranial Pressure]. Zeitschrift für die gesamte Neurologie und Psychiatrie (in German). 24 (1): 300–336. 1914. doi:10.1007/BF02866456.
- "Zur Methodik der Schädelkapazitätsbestimmung mit Hinsicht auf einen Fall von Hirnschwellung bei Katatonie" [On the Methodology of Determining Cranial Capacity with Regard to a Case of Brain Swelling in Catatonia]. Neurologisches Centralblatt (in German). 33 (12, 14): 738–743, 809. 1914.
- "Intravitale und postmortale Hirnschwellung; eine Erwiderung auf die Ausführungen Reihardt's" [Intravitam and Postmortem Brain Swelling: A Reply to Reihardt's Statements]. Neurologisches Centralblatt (in German). 33: 1085–1088. 1914.
- Nissl, Franz; Alzheimer, Alois, eds. (1913). "Experimentelle Studien über amöboide Umwandlung der Neuroglia" [Experimental Studies on the Amoeboid Transformation of Neuroglia]. Histologische und histopathologische Arbeiten über die Grosshirnrinde: mit besonderer Berücksichtigung der pathologischen Anatomie der Geisteskrankheiten [Histological and Histopathological Studies on the Cerebral Cortex: With Special Consideration of the Pathological Anatomy of Mental Illnesses] (in German). pp. 89–160.
- Rosental, S.; Hilffert, W. (1914). "Zur Frage der klinischen Verwertbarkeit des Abderhaldenschen Dialysierverfahrens in der Psychiatrie" [On the Clinical Applicability of Abderhalden's Dialysis Method in Psychiatry]. Zeitschrift für die gesamte Neurologie und Psychiatrie (in German). 26 (1): 6–21. doi:10.1007/BF02874455.
- Nissl, Franz, ed. (1914). "Zwei Fälle von Katatonie mit Hirnschwellung" [Two Cases of Catatonia with Cerebral Swelling]. Beiträge zur Frage nach der Beziehung zwischem klinischem Verlauf und anatomischem Befund bei Nerven- und Geisteskrankheiten [Contributions to the Question of the Relationship Between Clinical Course and Anatomical Findings in Nervous and Mental Illnesses] (in German). Berlin: J. Springer. pp. 1–112.
- "Ein Fall von organischer Verblödung mit eigenartigen Spannungszuständen der Muskulatur. Demonstration in naturhist. med. Verein in Heidelberg am 5 Mai 1914. Autoreferat" [A Case of Organic Dementia with Unusual Muscular Tension States. Demonstration at the Natural History Medical Association in Heidelberg on 5 May 1914. Author's abstract.]. Neurologisches Centralblatt (in German). 34 (13): 477–478. 1915.
- "Über Anfälle bei Dementia praecox" [On Seizures in Dementia Praecox]. Zeitschrift für die gesamte Neurologie und Psychiatrie (in German). 59 (1): 168–216. 1920. doi:10.1007/BF02901085.
