= William Moon (disambiguation) =

William Moon may refer to:

- William Moon, inventor of Moon type
- William Moon (EastEnders), fictional character on the BBC soap opera EastEnders
- Billy Moon, footballer and cricketer
- Willy Moon, New Zealand musician
