= Philipp Knoll =

Austrian pathologist

Philipp Knoll (4 July 1841, Karlsbad - 31 January 1900, Vienna) was a pathologist from Austria-Hungary.

In 1864 he obtained his medical doctorate at the University of Prague. Afterwards, he worked as an assistant to physician Anton von Jaksch (1810-1887) in Prague and to physiologist Conrad Eckhard (1822-1905) at the University of Giessen, where in 1869 he received his habilitation. In 1872 he became an associate professor of experimental pathology at Prague, followed by a full professorship in general and experimental pathology in 1879.

At Prague, he founded the Gesellschaft zur Förderung deutscher Wissenschaft, Kunst und Literatur in Böhmen (Society for the Promotion of German Science, Art and Literature in Bohemia). At the university he served as dean in 1887-88 and as rector in 1890-91. In 1898 he relocated to the University of Vienna as successor to pathologist Salomon Stricker (1834-1898).

== Associated eponym ==
- "Knoll glands": Defined as glands in the ventricular folds (false vocal cords) of the larynx.

== Selected writings ==
- Beiträge zur Physiologie der Vierhügel, 1869 - Contributions to the physiology of the quadrigeminal.
- Über die Wirkung von Chloroform und Äther auf Athmung und Blutkreislauf, 1878 - On the effects of chloroform and ether to respiration and the bloodstream.
- Ueber einen verbesserten Polygraphen, 1881 - On an improved polygraph.
- Über Protoplasmaarme und Protoplasmareiche Musculatur, 1891 - On protoplasmic poor and protoplasmic rich musculature.
- Beiträge zur heimischen Zeitgeschichte, 1900.
