= Royal Eye Hospital =

Royal Eye Hospital may refer to:

- Manchester Royal Eye Hospital, in Manchester, England, UK
- Royal Eye Hospital (South London), in South London, England, UK
- Royal Victoria Eye and Ear Hospital, in Dublin, Ireland
- Royal Victorian Eye and Ear Hospital, in East Melbourne, Victoria, Australia
