= Sigmund Exner =

Austrian physiologist

Siegmund Ritter Exner von Ewarten
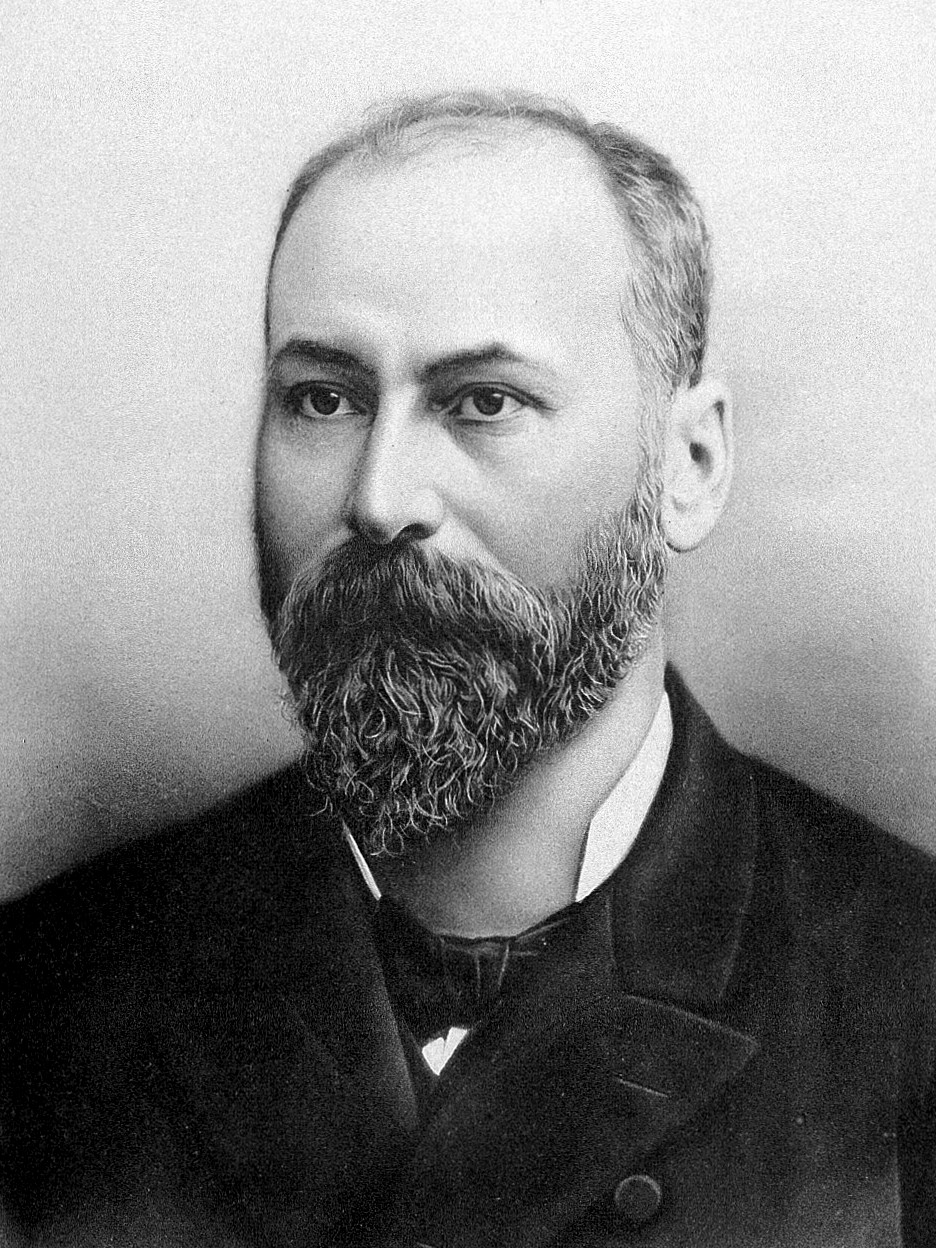
- Born: Siegmund Exner; 5 April 1846; Vienna
- Died: 5 February 1926 (aged 79); Vienna
- Occupation: physiologist
- Known for: localization
- Awards: Lieben Prize (1877, 1889)

Sigmund Exner (also Sigmund Exner, Siegmund Exner-Ewarten, Siegmund Exner Ritter von Ewarten; 5 April 1846 – 5 February 1926) was an Austrian physiologist born in Vienna.

== Academic career ==
He studied in Vienna under Ernst Wilhelm von Brücke (1819–1892), and in Heidelberg with Hermann von Helmholtz (1821–1894). In 1870 he received his degree, subsequently working as an assistant in the physiological institute at the University of Vienna. In 1891 he succeeded Ernst von Brücke as professor of physiology and director of the physiological institute. During his career, he received honorary doctorates from the Universities of Leipzig and Athens.

== Physiological research ==
Sigmund Exner is known for his work in comparative physiology, and his studies of perception psychology from a physiological standpoint. He conducted important research on localization of behavioral functionality in the brain, in particular studies on the functional architecture of the visual cortex. He performed investigations of color contrast, hue adaptation, apparent motion and on the sensitivity of retinal regeneration.

He explained how the compound eye functions, and in 1891, published "Die Physiologie der facettierten Augen von Krebsen und Insekten", describing the compound eye physiology of insects and crustaceans. In 1899, Exner co-founded the Phonogrammarchiv in Vienna, an archive for recording acoustic phenomena for scientific purposes.

== Family ==
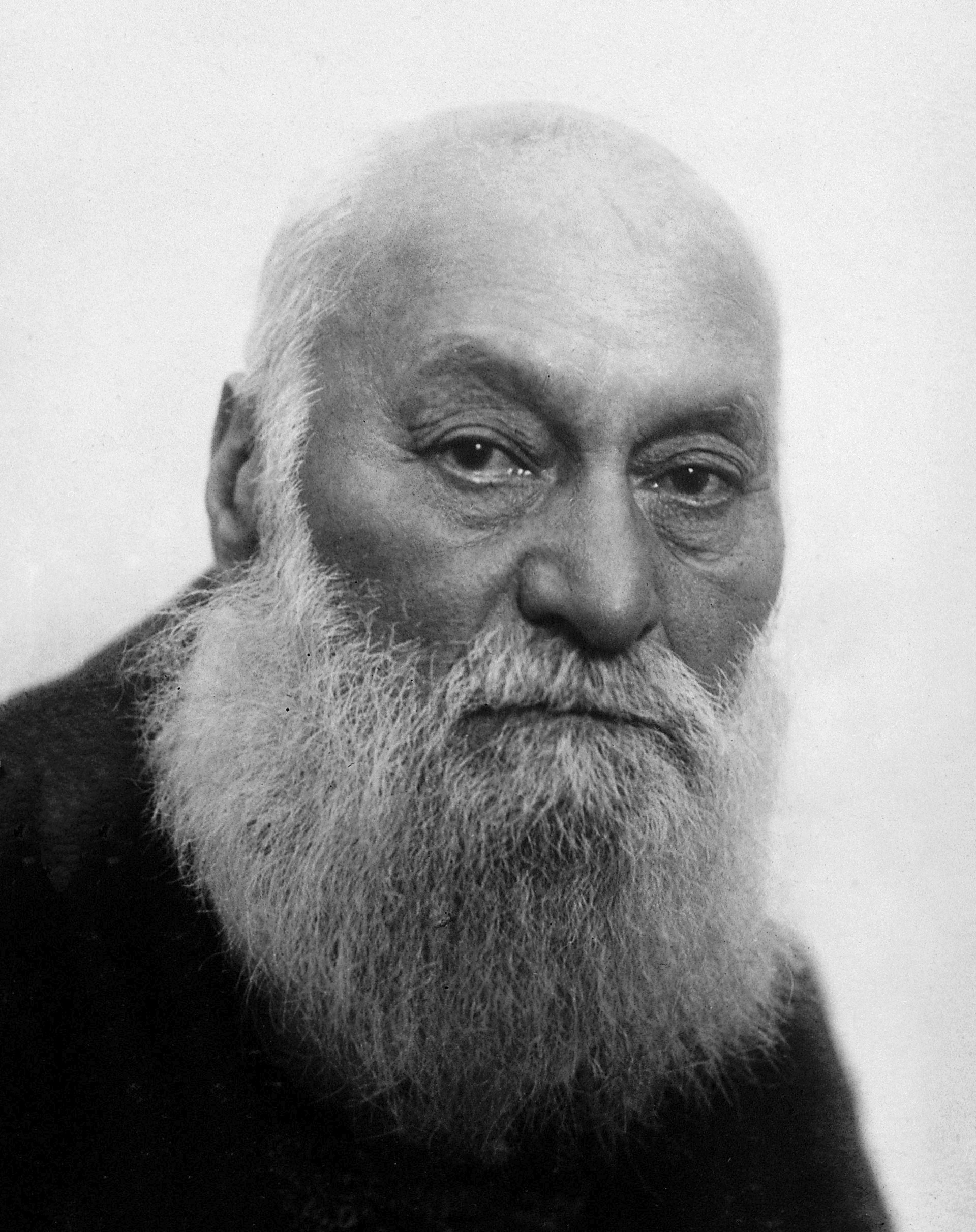
Siegmund Exner

He was the son of philosopher Franz-Serafin Exner (1802–1853), and had three renowned brothers; law professor Adolf Exner (1841–1894), physicist Karl Exner (1842–1914) and physicist Franz Exner (1849–1926). His sister, Marie, was married to urologist Anton von Frisch (1849–1917).

== Associated terms ==
- "Call-Exner bodies": Small spaces filled with eosinophilic fluid and basement membrane material, usually associated with granulosa cell tumours. Named with American physician Emma Louise Call (1847–1937).
- "Exner's area": A section of the brain just above Broca's area and anterior to the primary motor control area.
- "Exner's nerve": Nerve from the pharyngeal plexus to the cricothyroid membrane.
- "Exner's plexus": A plexus of superficial tangential fibers in the molecular layer of the cerebral cortex.

== Written works ==
- Leitfaden bei der mikroskopischen Untersuchung thierischer Gewebe (A guide to microscopic examination of animal tissue), (1878)
- Untersuchungen über die Localisation der Functionen in der Grosshirnrinde des Menschen (Studies on the localization of functions in the cerebral cortex); with Conrad Eckhard (1881)
- Die Physiologie des Fliegens und Schwebens in den bildenden Künsten (The physiology of flying and hovering in the visual arts), Lecture held at the Austrian Museum for Art and Industry, on 5 January 1882.
- Die Physiologie der facettirten Augen von Krebsen und Insecten (The physiology of the compound eye of crabs and insects); with Conrad Eckhard (1891)
- Entwurf zu einer physiologischen Erklärung der psychischen Erscheinungen von Dr. Sigmund Exner (Draft for a physiological explanation of mental phenomena by Dr. Sigmund Exner); with Conrad Eckhard (1894)
- Über das Schweben der Raubvögel (On hovering in birds of prey) In: Archiv für die gesamte Physiologie des Menschen und der Thiere 114: 109–142 (Reprint 2004, ISBN 3-936755-75-2)
