= Royal Eye Hospital (South London) =

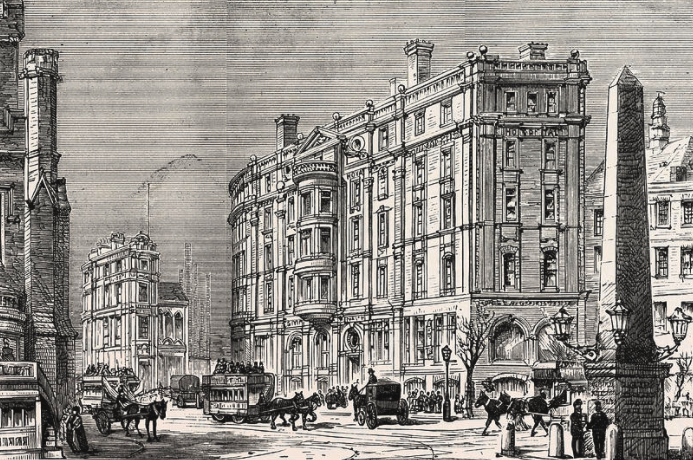
Royal South London Ophthalmic Hospital in the 1880s

The Royal Eye Hospital was established in 1857 by John Zachariah Laurence and Carsten Holthouse in South London as the South London Ophthalmic Hospital.

The hospital originally consisted of two beds in a house in St George's Circus. An adjoining house was acquired and the enlarged facilities were renamed the Surrey Ophthalmic Hospital in 1860. Three years later it became the Ophthalmic Hospital, with a further name change to the Royal South London Ophthalmic Hospital in 1869. In 1892 following the opening of a new enlarged building, designed by the architects Young and Hall, still in St George's Circus, it finally became known as the Royal Eye Hospital.

== After the NHS ==
In 1948 the hospital was incorporated into the newly founded National Health Service (NHS). It was originally allocated to the King's College Hospital Group During the reorganisation of the NHS in 1974, the REH was reallocated to the St Thomas' Hospital Group. After the provision of Ophthalmic medicine had taken in-house by St Thomas' Hospital, such services were stopped at the St George's Circus site. The building was used by local area health authorities before being left derelict and then demolished. The site is now occupied by McLaren House, which is one of hall of residences for students at London South Bank University.

== Notable staff ==
- Robert Charles Moon, ophthalmologist who, along with John Zachariah Laurence, identified Laurence-Moon syndrome

At least two matrons trained at The London Hospital in Whitechapel under Matron Eva Luckes:

- Margaret Islip (1860–1923), matron from 1892 Islip had worked under Luckes as a sister at Pendlebury Children's Hospital, before she trained under her between 1884 and 1886.
- Kate Elizabeth Norman (1864–1945), matron, from 1898 to 1926. Norman trained between 1892 and 1894, and also worked as a sister at Moorfields Eye Hospital before becoming matron at the Royal Eye Hospital.
