= Edwin Goldmann =

Biomedical researcher and surgeon (1862-1913)

- Born: 12 November 1862; Burgersdorp, Cape Colony
- Died: 12 August 1913 (aged 50); Freiburg im Breisgau, Germany
- Scientific career
- Academic advisors: Paul Ehrlich

Edwin Goldmann (12 November 1862 – 12 August 1913) was a biomedical researcher and surgeon most famous for his contributions in first characterizing the blood–brain barrier.

== Discovery of the blood–brain barrier ==
Goldmann's mentor, Paul Ehrlich, was studying staining in his bacteriological studies by injecting aniline dyes in several species of animal. While most of the anatomy stained equally well, the brain tissue exhibited less staining in many species. Goldmann discovered that when the dye (namely, trypan blue) was injected directly into the central nervous system instead of into the other organs, the brain would stain equally well as other organs — but the stain would not travel to the rest of the body.

This suggested the presence of a compartmentalization between the cerebrospinal fluid and the vasculature of the rest of the body. This barrier was first hypothesized by a Berlin physician, Max Lewandowsky, in 1900 (prior to Goldmann's empirical evidence).

Edwin Goldmann died from liver cancer in Freiburg on 13 August 1913.
