= Tactile alphabet =

Alphabet readable by touch

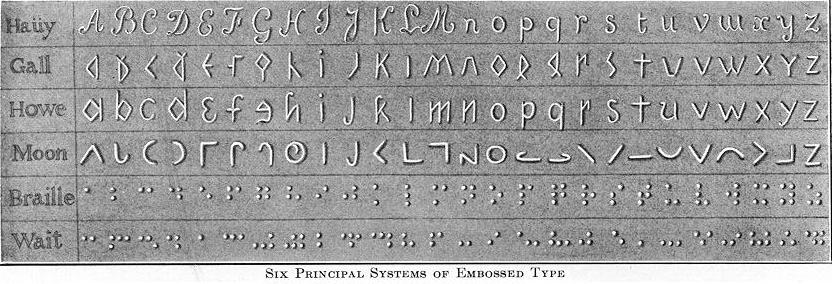
Six principal systems of embossed type in use c. 1900: Haüy, Gall, Howe, Moon, Braille, Wait

A tactile alphabet is a system for writing material that the blind can read by touch. While currently the Braille system is the most popular and some materials have been prepared in Moon type, historically, many other tactile alphabets have existed.

== Systems based on the embossed Latin alphabet ==
- Moon type
- Valentin Haüy's system (in italic style)
- James Gall's "triangular alphabet", using both capital and lower-case, which was used in 1826 in the first embossed books published in English
- Edmund Frye's system (capital letters only)
- John Alston's system (capital letters only)
- Jacob Snider, Jr.'s system, using rounded letters similar to Haüy's system, which was used in a publication of the Gospel of Mark in 1834, the first embossed book in the United States
- Samuel Gridley Howe's Boston Line using lowercase angular letters, influenced by Gall's system but more closely resembling standard Roman letters
- Julius Reinhold Friedlander's Philadelphia Line, using all capital letters, similar to Alston's system, used at the Pennsylvania Institution for the Instruction of the Blind (now the Overbrook School for the Blind) in Philadelphia
- William Chapin (also at the Pennsylvania Institution)'s system, combining the lowercase letters of the Boston Line with the capitals of the Philadelphia Line, forming the "combined system" (used by 1868 in books printed by N. B. Kneass, Jr.)
- Elia Chepaitis's ELIA Frame tactile alphabet/font system includes the major characteristics of the Roman alphabet letter within a frame. The frame denotes where the letter begins and ends and allows for systematic exploration. The use of the Roman alphabet's features in the design helps previously sighted people learn it. And its similarities to standard Roman fonts helps sighted caregivers to learn and share the alphabet with people who have a visual impairment.
- Decapoint – Obsolete tactile form of the Latin script

== Systems based on dots ==
- Night writing
- Braille
- New York Point, a system of points invented by William Bell Wait, that competed with braille for some time before braille won out
- Fakoo – Latin script converted into a three-by-three grid of dots

== Systems based on arbitrary symbols ==
- Thomas Lucas's system, based on shorthand and phonetic principles
- James Hatley Frere's system, similar to Lucas's in that it was based on shorthand, but written in a boustrophedon manner
- Vibratese

== See also ==
- Tactile graphic
- Tangible symbol systems
