= Fakoo =

- Period: 2006 – present

Related scripts
- Parent systems: Night writing: Braille; Fakoo

Fakoo is a tactile writing system based on nine raised dots. It was invented in 2006 by Alexander Fakoó as a counterpart to Braille. Latin characters were converted into 3 x 3 raised dots so they could be read by both blind and seeing people.
