= Robert Charles Moon =

British-born, American ophthalmologist and publisher (1844–1914)

- Born: 1844; Brighton, England
- Died: February, 13, 1914
- Resting place: West Laurel Hill Cemetery, Bala Cynwyd, Pennsylvania, U.S.
- Education: Jefferson Medical College
- Relatives: William Moon (father)
- Medical career
- Profession: ophthalmologist, publisher
- Institutions: South London Ophthalmic Hospital, Pennsylvania Home Teaching Society and Free Circulating Library for the Blind, Moon Society for the Blind
- Notable works: Identification of Laurence-Moon syndrome, Translation of Moon type to several languages, establishment of the Moon Press for the Blind

Robert Charles Moon (1844–February 13, 1914) was a British-born, American ophthalmologist and publisher. He and John Zachariah Laurence characterized Laurence–Moon syndrome.

His father, William Moon, developed Moon type, a tactile alphabet to allow blind people to read by touch. Robert helped his father translate it into several languages. He established the Moon Press for the Blind and published books and maps using Moon type. He served as secretary for the Pennsylvania Home Teaching Society and Free Circulating Library for the Blind and as a trustee of the Moon Society for the Blind.

== Early life and education ==
Moon was born in 1844 in Brighton, England. His father William Moon, lost his sight after contracting scarlet fever as a child. William developed Moon type to help blind people read, especially the Bible. Robert traveled with his father and helped him develop geographical and astronomical maps for the blind using Moon type. He also translated Moon type into multiple other languages.

== Career ==
From 1866 to 1878, he practiced medicine at the South London Ophthalmic Hospital, a facility founded in 1857 by Dr. John Zachariah Laurence. He partnered with Dr. Laurence to identify Laurence–Moon syndrome, a disease characterized by hypogonadism, intellectual disability, pigementary retinopathy, and spastic paraplegia.

In 1879, Moon emigrated to the United States, graduated from Jefferson Medical College, and worked as an ophthalmologist. He served as secretary for the Pennsylvania Home Teaching Society and Free Circulating Library for the Blind in Philadelphia. He established the Moon Press for the Blind and published books and charts for blind people. He served as a trustee of the Moon Society for the Blind in England.

He died February 13, 1914, and was interred at West Laurel Hill Cemetery in Bala Cynwyd, Pennsylvania.
