= Keith Young =

English architect (1848-1929)

Keith Downes Young
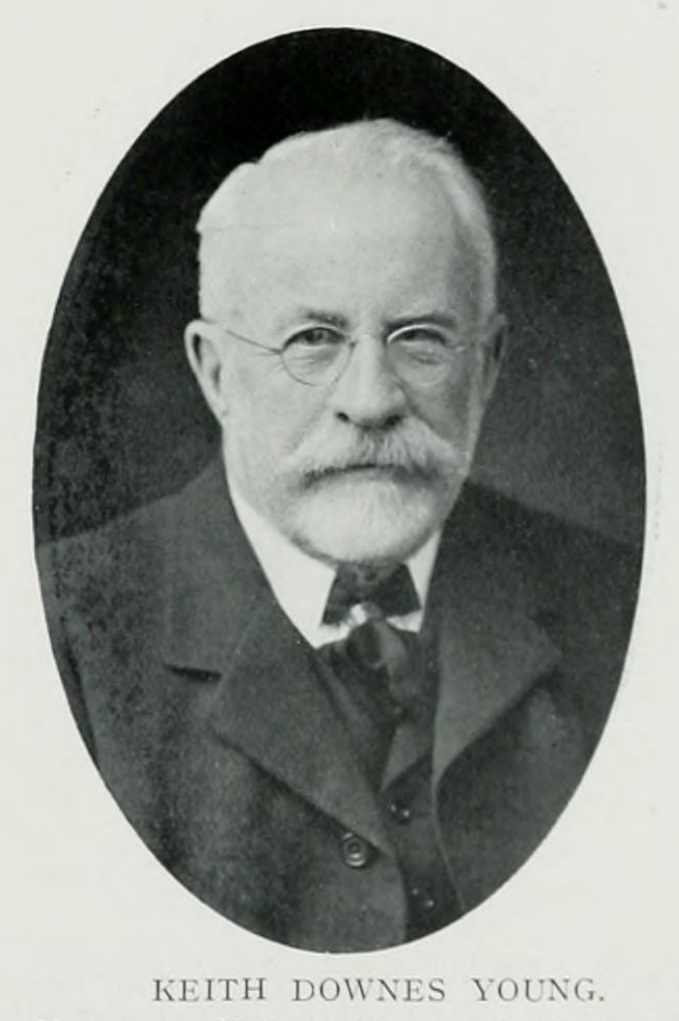
- Photographic portrait of Keith Downes Young.
- Born: 12 September 1848; Richmond, Surrey, England
- Died: 1 December 1929 (aged 81)
- Resting place: Highgate Cemetery
- Education: Tonbridge School
- Occupation: Architect

Keith Downes Young (12 September 1848 - 1 December 1929) was an English architect best known for designing hospitals and school sanatoria.

== Biography ==
Keith Downes Young was born in King's Road, Richmond, Surrey on 12 September 1848. He attended Tonbridge School, after which, in 1865, he was articled to his father, George Adam Young. He studied at South Kensington School of Art and the Architectural Association.

He commenced independent practice in London in 1871 and entered into partnership with his father the following year. By 1886 he had entered into partnership with the church architect, Henry Hall, and their practice acquired a reputation for designing hospitals and school sanatoria. The partnership of Young and Hall was considered to be the pre-eminent British architects in the designing of hospitals. By 1922 sixteen hospitals had been built to their designs and over thirty-five others had been remodelled and rebuilt under their direction.

Young practiced for over fifty years, advising on approximately forty hospitals, either as new buildings or alterations, including the Middlesex Hospital, the Royal Eye Hospital, the Hospital for Epilepsy and Paralysis, the Chelsea Hospital for Women and Guy's Hospital Medical School. Young held long-term positions as architect to the London Fever Hospital and the Middlesex Hospital. He was also appointed as Honorary Architect to the Royal Eye Hospital.

Keith Downes Young died on 1 December 1929 and was buried on the eastern side of Highgate Cemetery.

== Selected works ==
Hospitals:

- Derbyshire Royal Infirmary, Derby
- Royal Eye Hospital, Southwark
- Victoria Hospital for Children, Tite Street, Chelsea
- Evelina Hospital for Children, Southwark
- Royal Dental Hospital, Leicester Square
- East Sussex Hospital, Hastings
- Great Northern Hospital, Holloway
- Hampstead General Hospital, Pond Street, Hampstead
- Bolingbroke Hospital, Battersea
- Chelsea Hospital for Women, Dovehouse Street
- London Fever Hospital, Islington (Isolation Block)
- Ear, Nose and Throat Hospital, Gray's Inn Road
- Maida Vale Hospital, Maida Vale
- Chest Hospital, Putney
- Miller Hospital, Greenwich
- Middlesex Hospital, Marylebone

School Sanatoria:

- Harrow School, Harrow
- Clifton College, Bristol
- Shrewsbury School, Shrewsbury
- Sherborne School, Dorset
- Blundell's School, Tiverton

Other works:

- Evening Standard Building, Shoe Lane, City of London
- Dunsley Hall, near Whitby, North Yorkshire
- Extension to Royal College of Surgeons, Lincoln's Inn Fields

== Gallery ==
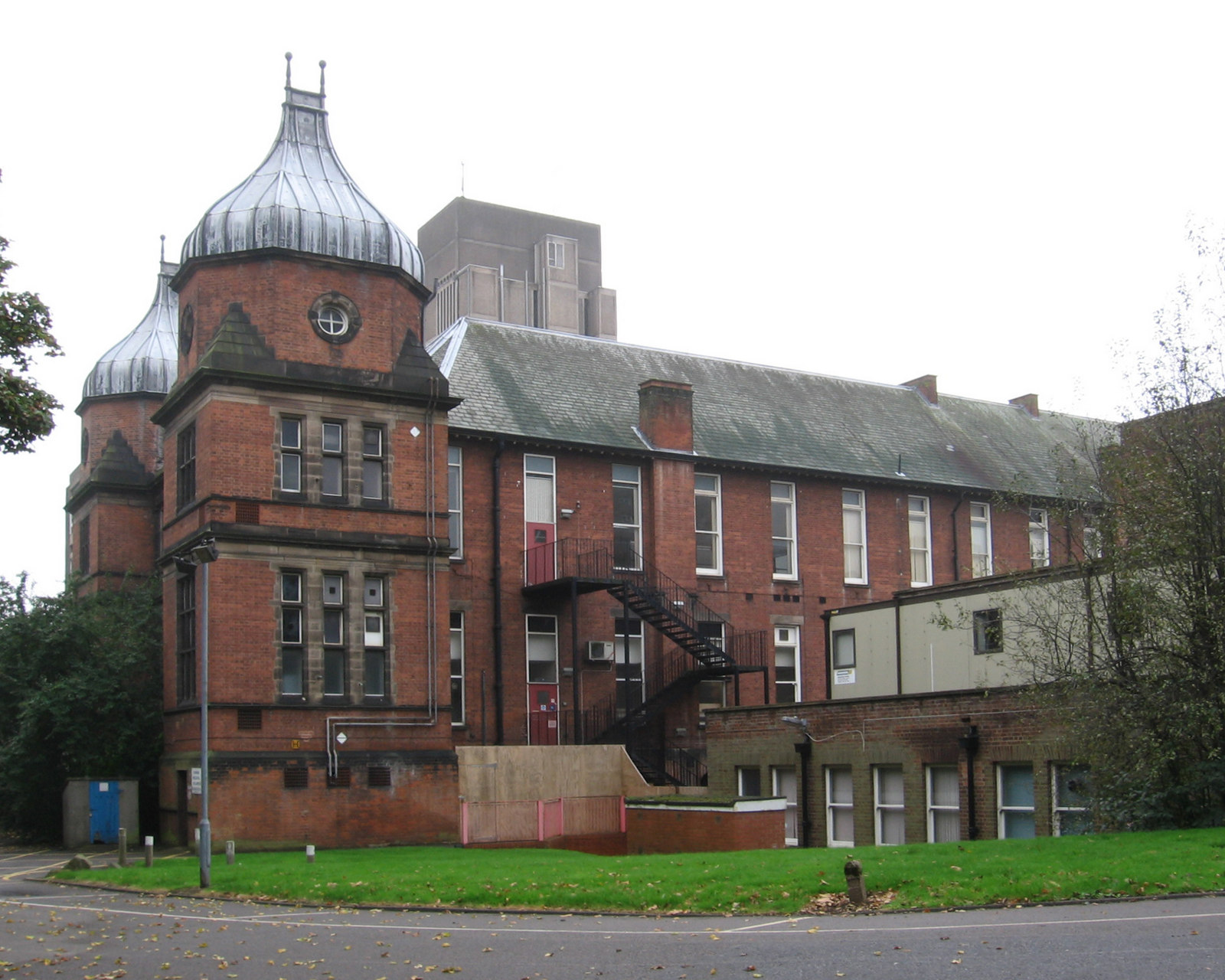
Derbyshire Royal Infirmary.

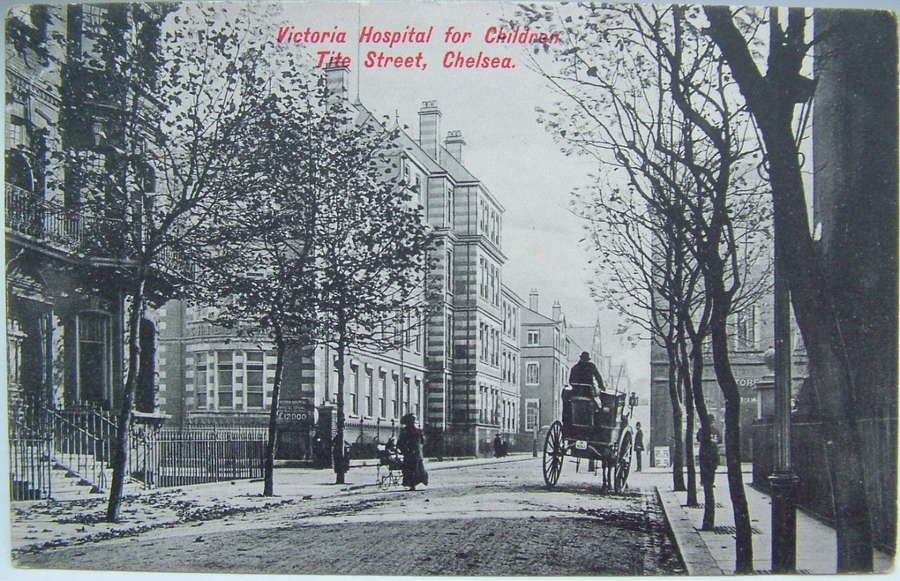
Victoria Hospital for Children, Chelsea.

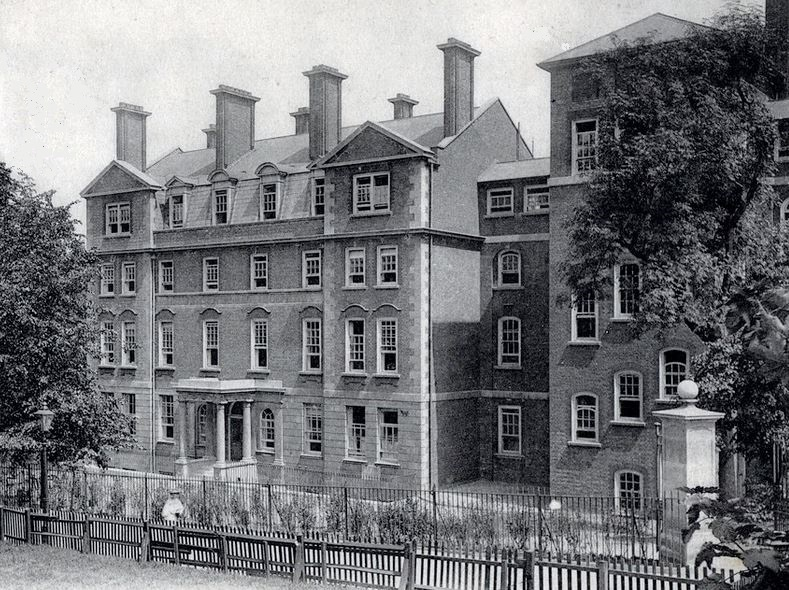
Hampstead General Hospital, Pond Street, NW3.

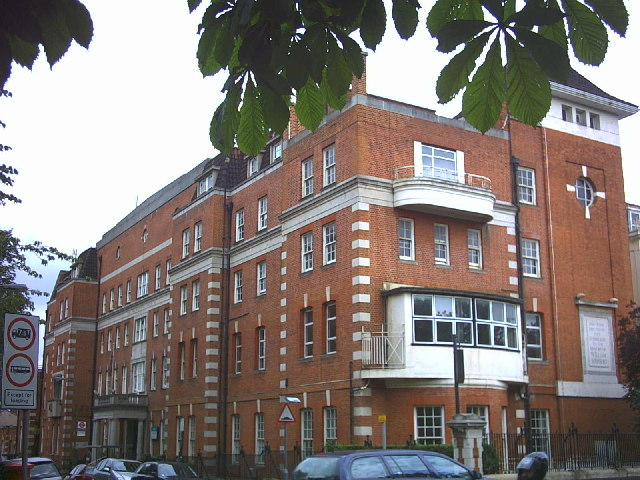
Bolingbroke Hospital, Battersea.

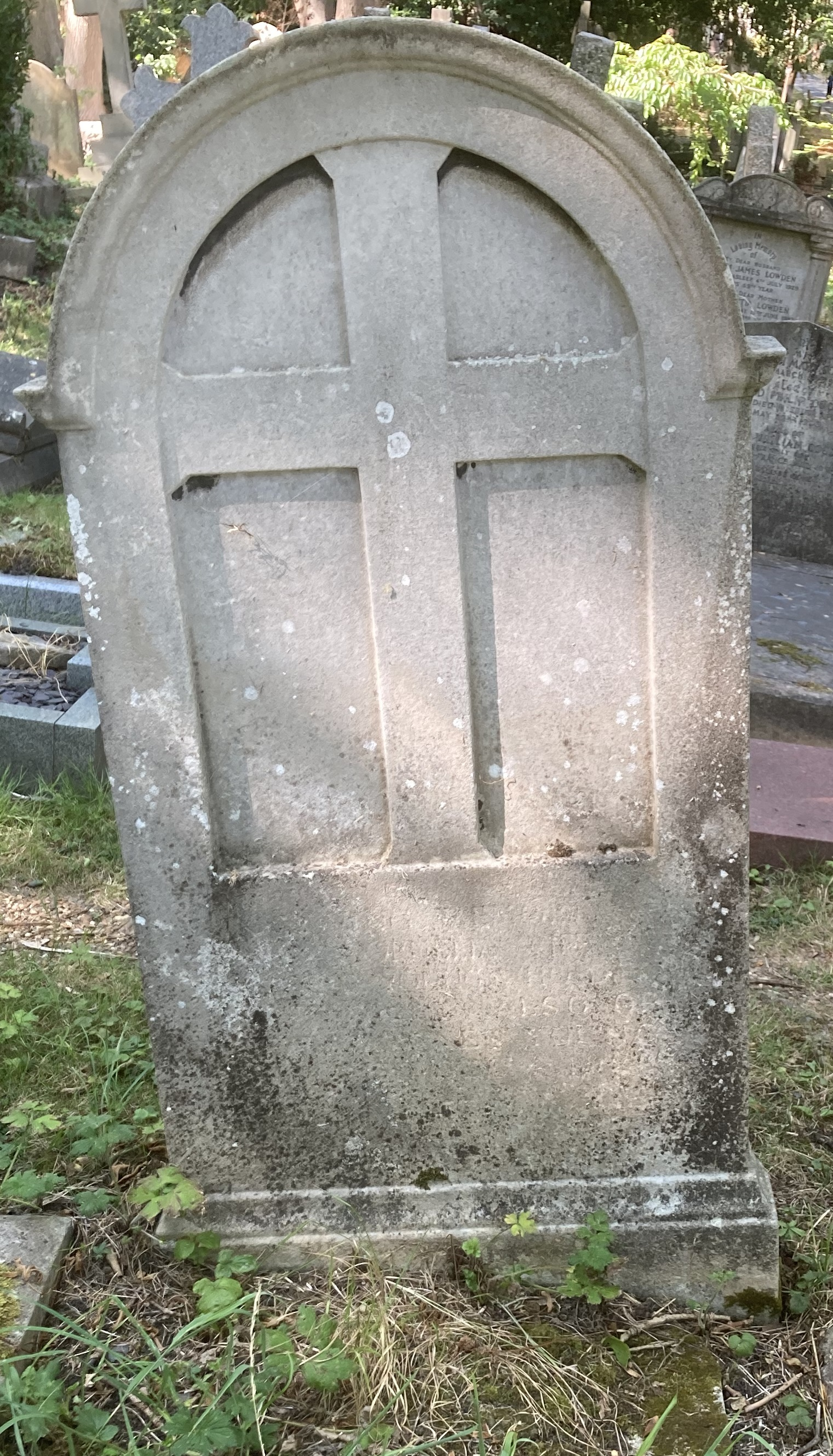
Grave of Keith Young in Highgate Cemetery.
