= Matthew Martin (merchant) =

English merchant (1748-1838)

- Born: 1748; Somerset, England
- Died: November 20, 1838 (aged 89–90)
- Occupations: Merchant and naturalist
- Known for: Scientific works on plants and beggars in the metropolis

Matthew Martin (1748–1838) was an English merchant, known as a naturalist and philanthropist. He was also known for his work identifying the circumstances of beggars in the metropolis as a Fellow of the Royal Society.

== Life ==
Born in Somerset, Martin was engaged in trade at Exeter. He was a member of the Bath Philosophical Society, and in 1794 he was elected a Fellow of the Royal Society. Later he obtained the post of secretary to a commission for adjusting St. Domingo claims, and settled in a house adjoining Poets' Corner, Westminster.

To Martin's efforts, with others, was due the institution, in January 1805, of the Bath Society for the Investigation and Relief of Occasional Distress. He died at Blackheath, aged 90, on 20 November 1838. His wife died 9 August 1827, aged 73.

== Works ==
Martin published The Aurelian's Vade-mecum; containing an English Catalogue of Plant' affording nourishment to Butterflies, Hawkmoths, and Moths in the state of Caterpillar, Exeter, 1785, and Observations on Marine Vermes, Insects, &c., fasc. 1, Exeter, 1786.

About 1796 Martin began "an enquiry into the circumstances of beggars in the metropolis", and joined the Society for Bettering the Condition and Increasing the Comforts of the Poor, of which he acted for a time as secretary. His Mendicity Enquiry Office, set up that year, interviewed 2,000 adults (over 90% female) and 3,000 children in seven months. He proposed a plan for a systematic inquiry into the nature and extent of begging in London, and in 1800 obtained a grant of £1,000 from the treasury in two instalments. His report, in the form of a Letter to Lord Pelham on the State of Mendicity in the Metropolis, was published in 1803, and reissued by the society in 1811. Martin estimated that London had 15,000 beggars, if children were included. He saw the workhouse as contributing to professional begging.

In 1812 Martin apparently undertook a further inquiry, supported in part by a government grant and in part by subscriptions. He issued An Appeal to Public benevolence for the Relief of Beggars, 1812. A parliamentary committee in 1815 heard a report based on 4,500 cases.

== Notes ==
Attribution

This article incorporates text from a publication now in the public domain: Lee, Sidney, ed. (1893). "Martin, Matthew". Dictionary of National Biography. Vol. 36. London: Smith, Elder & Co.
