= John Zachariah Laurence =

English ophthalmologist

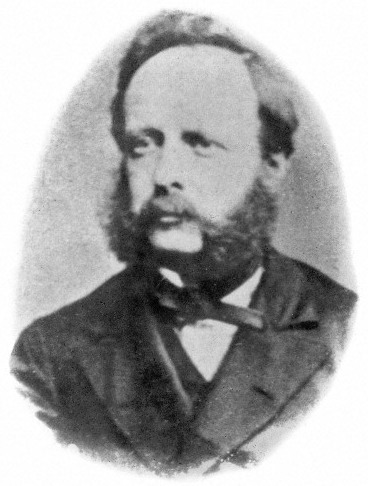
John Zachariah Laurence

John Zachariah Laurence (1829 – 18 July 1870) was an English ophthalmologist who practiced medicine in London. He was the founder of the South London Ophthalmic Hospital in 1857, later to become known as the Royal Eye Hospital.

He was born into a middle-class Jewish family, his great-grandfather moving from Bohemia.

With Jabez Spence Ramskill (1824–1897) the first physician, Charles Edouard Brown-Séquard, William Fergusson, Surgeon Extraordinary to Queen Victoria, Laurence was one of only four medical staff who founded the Hospital for the Paralysed and Epileptic at Queen (now the National Hospital) in 1860.(Pearce JMS. John Zachariah Laurence: 'forgotten luminary' Advances in Clinical Neuroscience and Rehabilitation 2019.)

In 1864 he became founder and editor of the Ophthalmic Review, the first British journal devoted to ophthalmology. Also, he is credited for promoting usage of the ophthalmoscope in England.

In 1866 he described a syndrome of retinitis pigmentosa, loss of vision progressing to blindness, intellectual disability, stunted stature and hypogonadism. This disease would become known as the Laurence–Moon syndrome, named along with his colleague Robert Charles Moon.

Laurence was a man of great gifts and versatility, a philanthropist, and a pioneer of new ideas. He was also a fine linguist, and was deeply interested in the Arts. For reasons uncertain his work was undervalued as Arnold Sorsby's (1900–1980) belated obituary reveals: Laurence was well and truly interred by his contemporaries. They had come to bury Caesar not to praise him. Eleven years later the existence of an Ophthalmic Review that he had founded and edited for nearly, four years (1864–7) but which had not survived longer than that, was not mentioned by its new editors.(Sorsby A. John Zachariah Laurence- a belated tribute. Brit J Ophthalmic 1932;16(11):727–40.)

He was described as: "A scholarly and wise man, and his intelligence and versatility served the hospital well at its inception. He may have helped to introduce the ophthalmoscope developed by Hermann von Helmholtz (1851) at Queen Square.2(p .363) His name remains only in the rare, eponymous Laurence-Moon-Biedl syndrome.

== Selected writings ==
- "The Sensibility of the Eye to Colour", 1861.
- The diagnosis of Surgical Cancer (which won the Lister Prize) London, 1855.
- The optical defects of the Eye. London, 1865.
- Handbook of Ophthalmic Surgery for the Use of Practitioners; written with Robert C. Moon. London, Robert Hardwicke, 1 January 1866.
