= Therese Biedl =

Austrian computer scientist

- Education: Rutgers University
- Known for: Computational geometry, planar graphs
- Awards: Ross & Muriel Cheriton Faculty Fellow, 2011
- Website: https://cs.uwaterloo.ca/~biedl/

Therese Charlotte Biedl is an Austrian computer scientist known for her research in computational geometry and graph drawing. Currently she is a professor at the University of Waterloo in Canada.

== Education ==
Biedl received her Diploma in Mathematics at Technische Universität Berlin, graduating in 1996 and earned a Ph.D. from Rutgers University in 1997 under the supervision of Endre Boros.

== Research ==
Biedl's research is in developing algorithms related to graphs and geometry. Planar graphs are graphs that can be drawn without crossings. Biedl develops algorithms that minimize or approximate the area and the height of such drawings.^{[A]} With Alam, Felsner, Gerasch, Kaufmann, and Kobourov, Biedl found provably optimal linear time algorithms for proportional contact representation of a maximal planar graph.^{[C]}

== Awards ==
Biedl was named a Ross & Muriel Cheriton Faculty Fellow in 2011, a recognition of the reach and importance of her scholarly works.

== Selected publications ==
A.	Biedl, Therese (2014). "On Area-Optimal Planar Graph Drawings". Automata, Languages, and Programming: 41st International Colloquium, ICALP 2014, Copenhagen, Denmark, July 8–11, 2014, Proceedings, Part I. Lecture Notes in Computer Science. Vol. 8572. Springer. pp. 198–210. doi:10.1007/978-3-662-43948-7_17.

B.	Alam, Md Jawaherul; Biedl, Therese; Felsner, Stefan; Kaufmann, Michael; Kobourov, Stephen G.; Ueckerdt, Torsten (1 October 2013). "Computing Cartograms with Optimal Complexity". Discrete & Computational Geometry. 50 (3): 784–810. arXiv:1201.0066. doi:10.1007/s00454-013-9521-1. S2CID 47049050.

C.	Alam, Muhammad Jawaherul; Biedl, Therese; Felsner, Stefan; Gerasch, Andreas; Kaufmann, Michael; Kobourov, Stephen G. (2011). "Linear-Time Algorithms for Hole-Free Rectilinear Proportional Contact Graph Representations". Algorithms and Computation: 22nd International Symposium, ISAAC 2011, Yokohama, Japan, December 5–8, 2011, Proceedings. Lecture Notes in Computer Science. Vol. 7074. Springer. pp. 281–291. doi:10.1007/978-3-642-25591-5_30.

D.	Biedl, Therese (2002). "Drawing outer-planar graphs in O(n log n) area". Graph Drawing:10th International Symposium, GD 2002, Irvine, CA, USA, August 26–28, 2002, Revised Papers. Lecture Notes in Computer Science. Vol. 2528. Springer. pp. 54–65. doi:10.1007/3-540-36151-0_6. MR 2063411.

E.	Biedl, Therese C.; Bose, Prosenjit; Demaine, Erik D.; Lubiw, Anna (2000). "Efficient Algorithms for Petersen's Matching Theorem". Journal of Algorithms. 38 (1): 110–134. doi:10.1006/jagm.2000.1132. S2CID 287038.

F.	Biedl, Therese; Kant, Goos (1998). "A better heuristic for orthogonal graph drawings". Computational Geometry. 9 (3): 159–180. doi:10.1016/s0925-7721(97)00026-6. hdl:1874/2715.
