= Max Lewandowsky =

German neurologist (1876–1918)

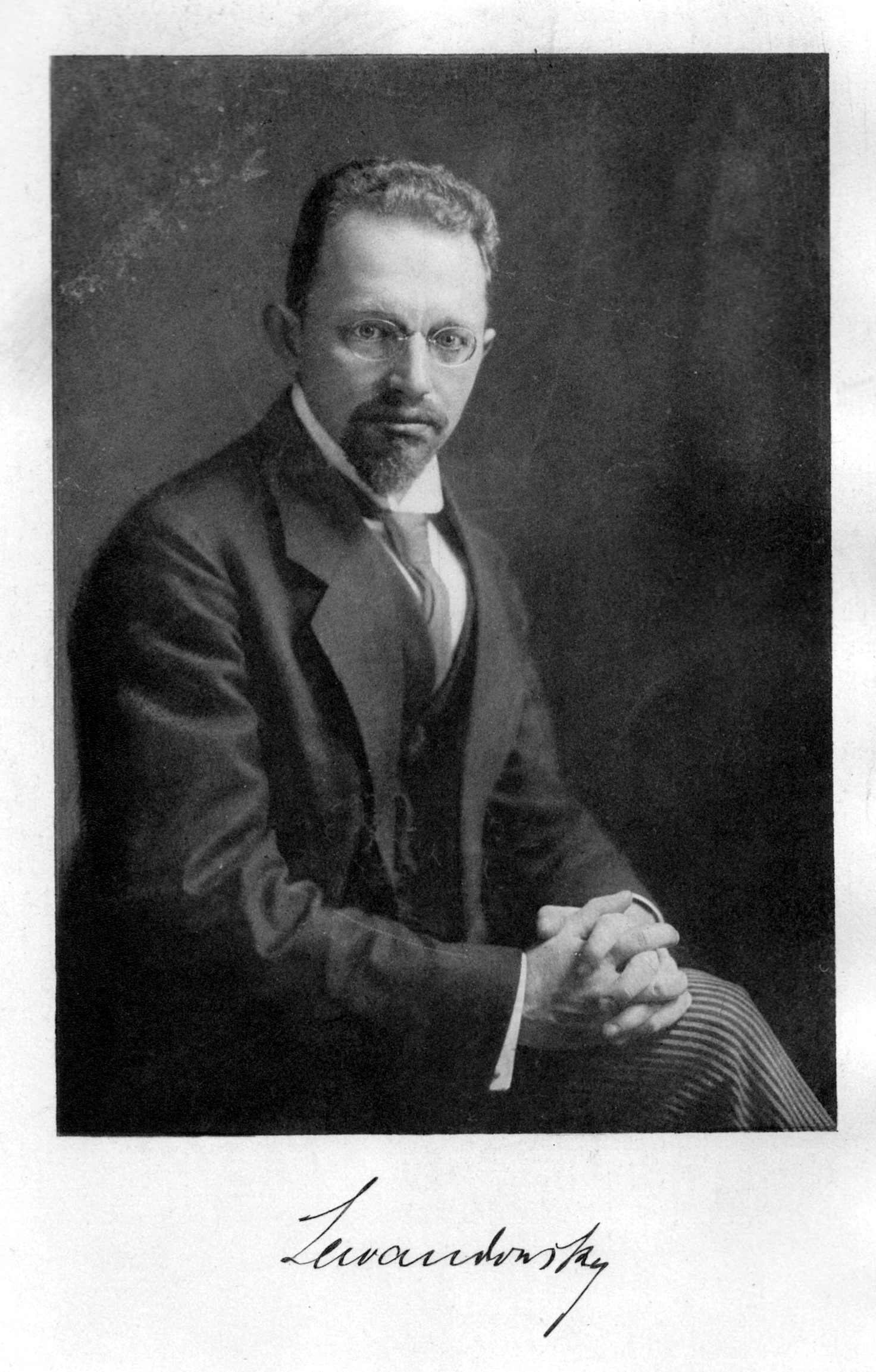
Portrait of Lewandowsky

Max Lewandowsky (28 June 1876 – 4 April 1918) was a German neurologist, who was a native of Berlin, born into a Jewish family.

== Personal life ==
Lewandowsky studied medicine at the Universities of Marburg, Berlin and Halle, earning his medical doctorate at Halle in 1898. In 1902 he obtained his post-graduate qualification for physiology, and in 1904, received training in clinical neurology and psychiatry under Karl Bonhoeffer and Franz Nissl at the University of Heidelberg. Afterwards he travelled to Paris, where he studied under neurologist Pierre Marie. Beginning in 1905 he worked in the Berlin-Friedrichshain hospital. During World War I he became infected with typhus and died.

== Academic contributions ==
Lewandowsky coined the term blood–brain barrier in 1900, referring to the hypothesized semipermeable membrane which separated the human central nervous system from the rest of the body's vasculature, and which prevented the entry of certain compounds from entering the brain when injected into the bloodstream. Two years earlier, researchers Arthur Biedl and R. Kraus had formed a similar hypothesis when low-concentration "bile salts" failed to affect behavior (and thus, in theory, had failed to enter the brain) when injected into the bloodstream of animals.

In 1908, Lewandowsky and Stadelmann published the first report of an individual with calculation impairment due to brain damage (acalculia; the term would later be introduced by Salomon Eberhard Henschen in 1925). The individual had trouble performing calculations on paper and mentally. Further, he had difficulty recognizing arithmetic symbols. The report was key in that it established calculation disorders as separate from language disorders, as the two were formerly associated.

Beginning in 1910 he, together with Alois Alzheimer, edited the journal Zeitschrift für die gesamte Neurologie und Psychiatrie. He was also editor of a handbook of neurology, Handbuch der Neurologie (1910–1914).

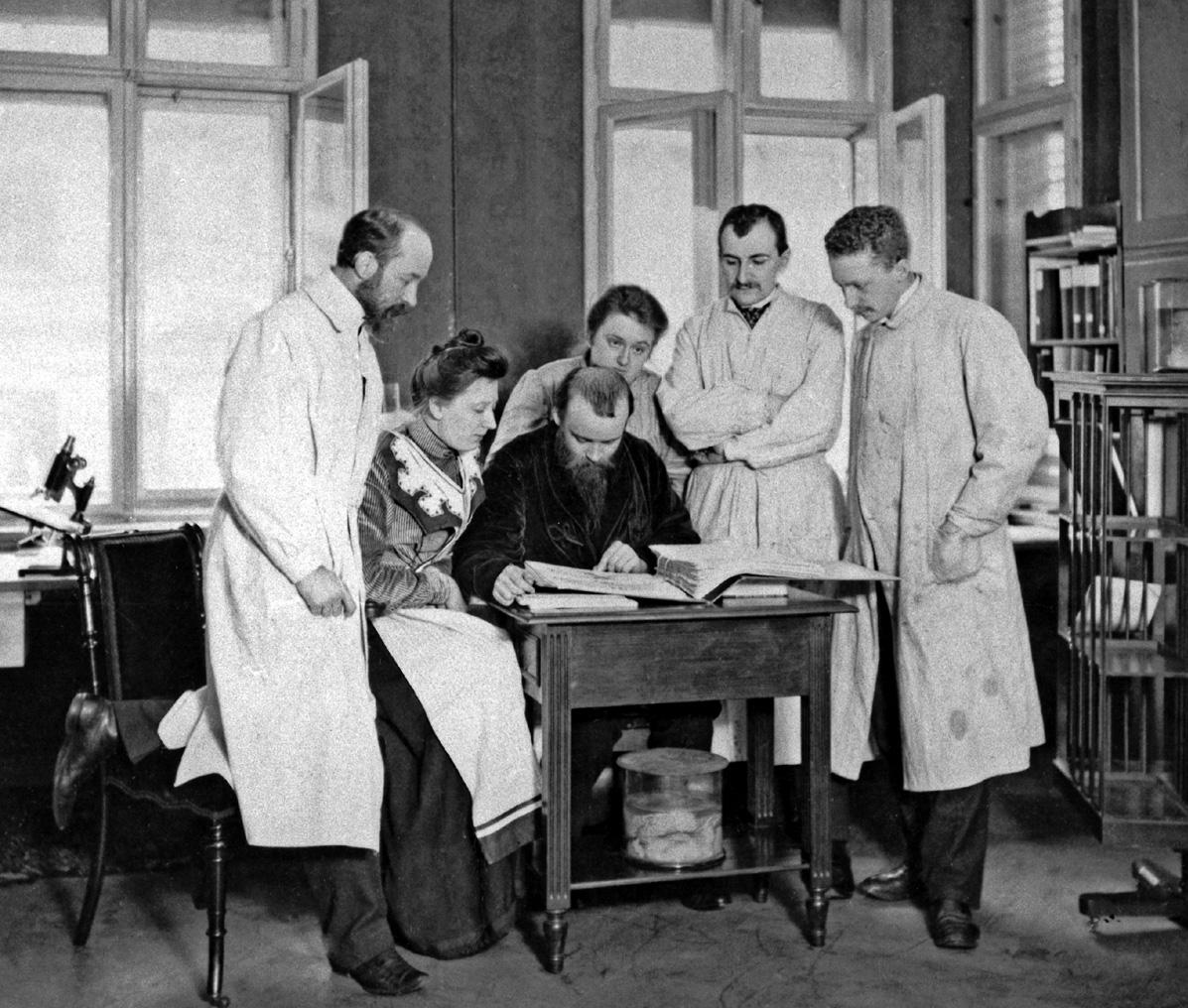
Neurobiological laboratory in Berlin (circa 1903); From the left: Korbinian Brodmann, Cécile Vogt-Mugnier, Oskar Vogt, Louise Bosse, Max Borcherdt and Max Lewandowsky.
