= Georges Bardet =

French physician

Georges, Louis, Bardet (1885–1966) was a French physician who is known for first describing a rare genetic disease. In his graduation thesis at the University of Paris in 1920, Bardet wrote about a medical condition characterized by obesity, retinitis pigmentosa, polydactyly and hypogonadism. Two years later, Hungarian physician Arthur Biedl described the same symptoms in two sisters, separate from Bardet's findings. This condition has since become known as the Bardet–Biedl syndrome.

Georges Bardet was the uncle of Jean Bardet, the founder of Éditions du Seuil.
