= Gaston Bardet =

French architect and writer

Gaston Bardet (1 April 1907 – 30 May 1989) was a French architect and writer. In his later works of the 1970s, Bardet used a pseudonym, signing his works Jean-Gaston.
