= Moon type =

Writing system for the blind

Moon
- Script type: Alphabet
- Creator: William Moon
- Period: 1845–present
- Direction: Mixed
- Languages: English, French, German, Dutch, Danish, Russian, Arabic, Armenian, Greek, Hindustani, Chinese

Related scripts
- Parent systems: Latin alphabet: Moon

ISO 15924
- ISO 15924: Moon (218), Moon (Moon code, Moon script, Moon type)

The Moon System of Embossed Reading (commonly known as the Moon writing, Moon alphabet, Moon script, Moon type, or Moon code) is a writing system for the blind, using embossed symbols mostly derived from the Latin script (but simplified). It is claimed by its supporters to be easier to understand than braille, though it is mainly used by people who have lost their sight as adults, and thus already have knowledge of the shapes of letters.

== History ==
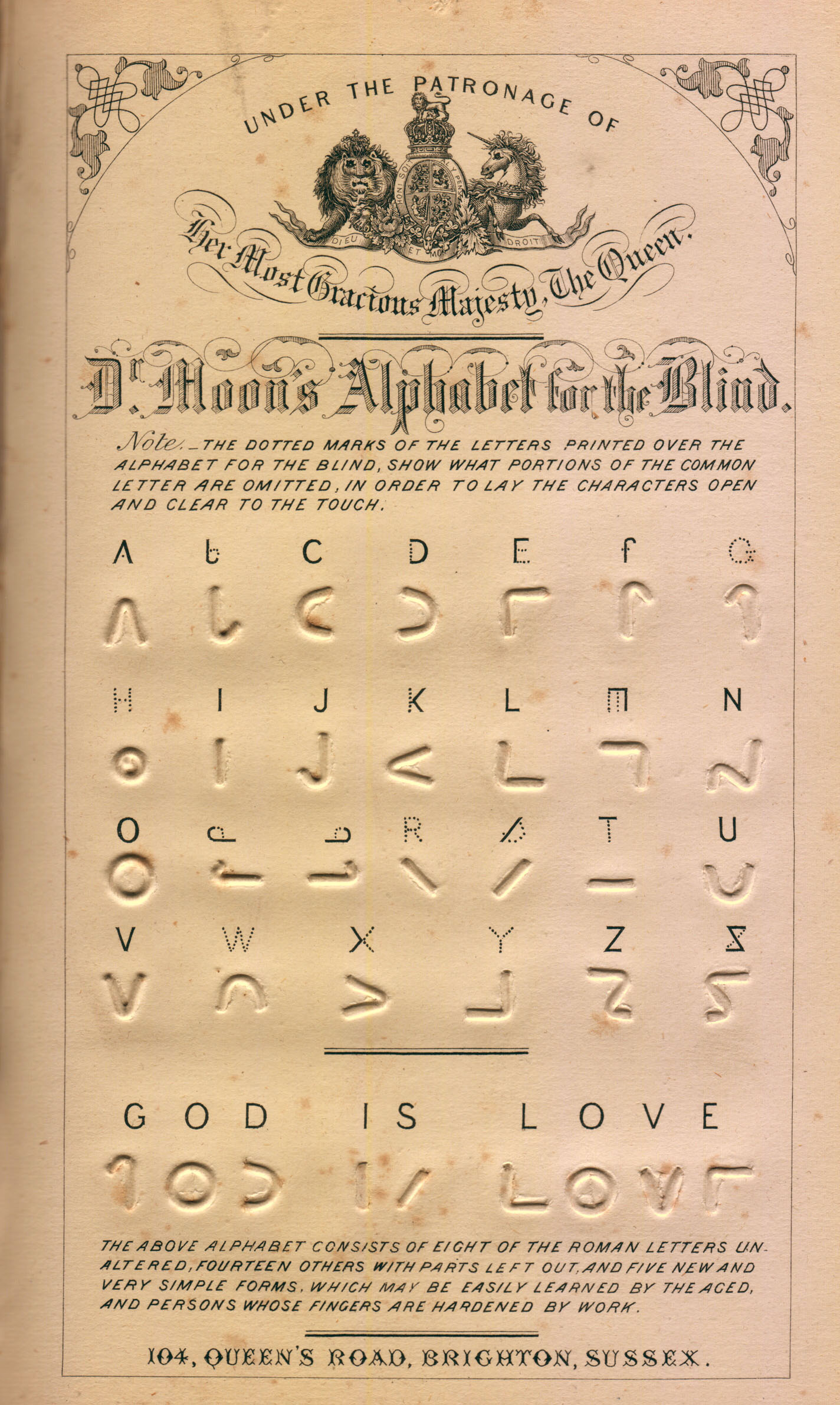
Dr Moon's Alphabet for the Blind, from his Light for the Blind, published in 1877

Moon type was developed by William Moon (1818–1894), a blind Englishman living in Brighton, East Sussex. After a bout of scarlet fever, Moon lost his sight at age 21 and became a teacher of blind children. He discovered that his pupils had great difficulty learning to read the existing styles of embossed reading codes, and devised his own system that would be "open and clear to the touch." Moon would first formulate his ideas in 1843, and eventually published the scheme in 1845.

His son, Robert Charles Moon, helped William develop geographical and astronomical maps for the blind using Moon type. He also translated Moon type into multiple other languages. He established the Moon Press for the Blind and published books and charts for blind people.

Rather than the dots of braille type, Moon type is made up of raised curves, angles, and lines. As the characters are quite large and over half the letters bear a strong resemblance to the print equivalent, Moon has been found particularly suitable for those who lose their sight later in life or for people who may have a less keen sense of touch. It has also proved successful as a mode of literacy for children with additional physical and/or learning difficulties.

=== Foreign languages ===
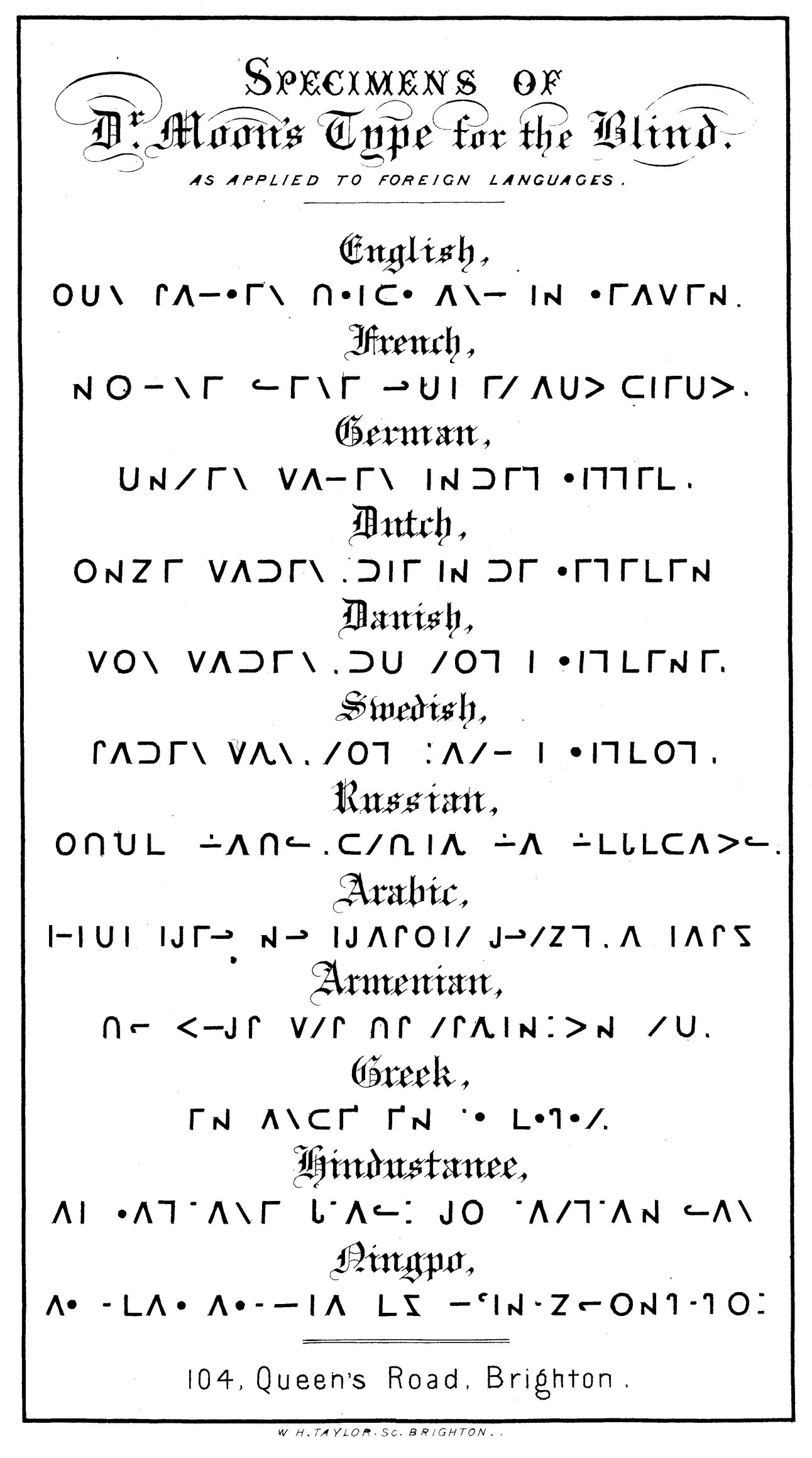
Specimens of Dr Moon's Type for the Blind, “Our father which art in heaven” applied to several languages, from his Light for the Blind, published in 1877

English Christian missionaries in Ningbo (Ningpo), China, during the Qing dynasty, used Moon type to teach blind locals how to read in their local dialect. Missionaries who spoke the Ningbo dialect ran the "Home for Indigent Old People," where most of the inmates were blind. In 1874, an English missionary taught a young blind man to read romanised Ningbo written in Moon type. The Gospel of Luke was then transcribed into two large volumes of Moon type. A Swiss missionary placed notices on placards throughout the city of Ningbo stating that he would give food and money to the blind people who visited. The Gospel of Mark was transcribed into Moon type using romanized Mandarin, however, without the tone marks. Missionary Hudson Taylor, who had been involved with the transcription of the gospels, did not find tone marks necessary, as the romanised Ningbo vernacular has never used tone marks. However, aspirated consonants were distinguished.

== Characters ==
=== Letters ===

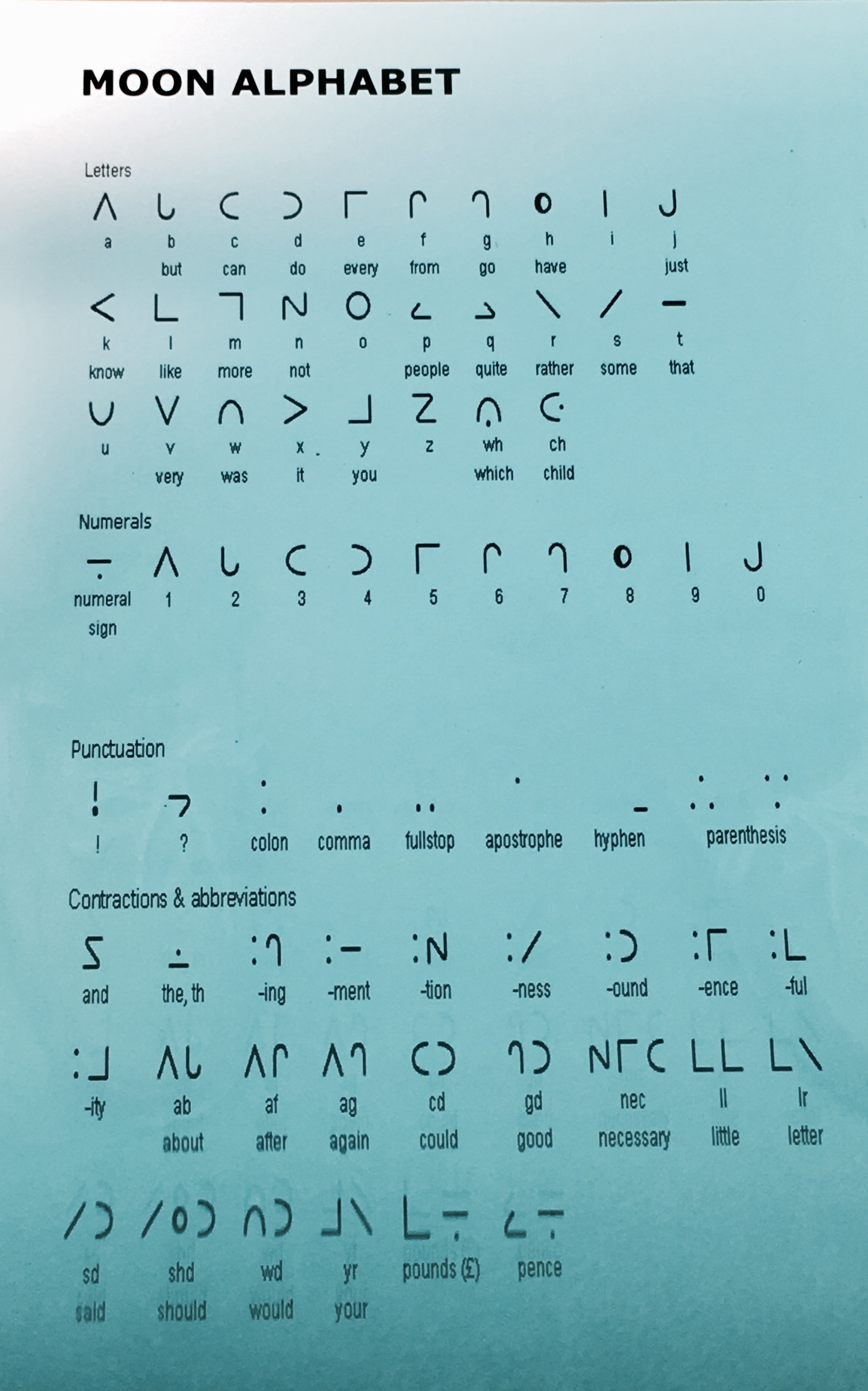
The Moon alphabet, including some contractions

As with braille, there is a Grade 1 using one Moon character per one Latin character and a Grade 2 using contractions and shorthand that make texts more compact and faster to read, though requiring more study.

=== Numbers ===
Similarly to Braille, the initial version of Moon type used the first ten letters with a "number start" symbol as digits.

Start	1	2	3	4	5	6	7	8	9	0

A later version used different symbols for each digit (StaffsMaths). These symbols are more complex to print.

=== Punctuation ===
The type also includes punctuation.

=== Dotty Moon ===
Besides the original type formed by lines, there is the possibility of using certain Braille embossers to produce dot patterns (Dotty Moon or Dotted Moon) in the shape of Moon characters. The patterns are disposed as a 5x5 grid.

== Direction ==
Initially the text changed direction (but not character orientation) at the end of the lines. Special embossed lines connected the end of a line and the beginning of the next. However, with the use of computers, it changed to a left-to-right orientation.

== Reception ==
The Royal National Institute for the Blind for wider universality prefers braille.

== Bibliography ==
- This article incorporates text from The Chinese Times, a publication from 1889, now in the public domain in the United States.
- Farrell, Gabriel (1956). The Story of Blindness. Cambridge: Harvard University Press. OCLC 263655.

== See also ==
- Graffiti / Graffiti 2 writing systems used on Palm OS devices
