= William Moon =

British inventor (1818–1894)

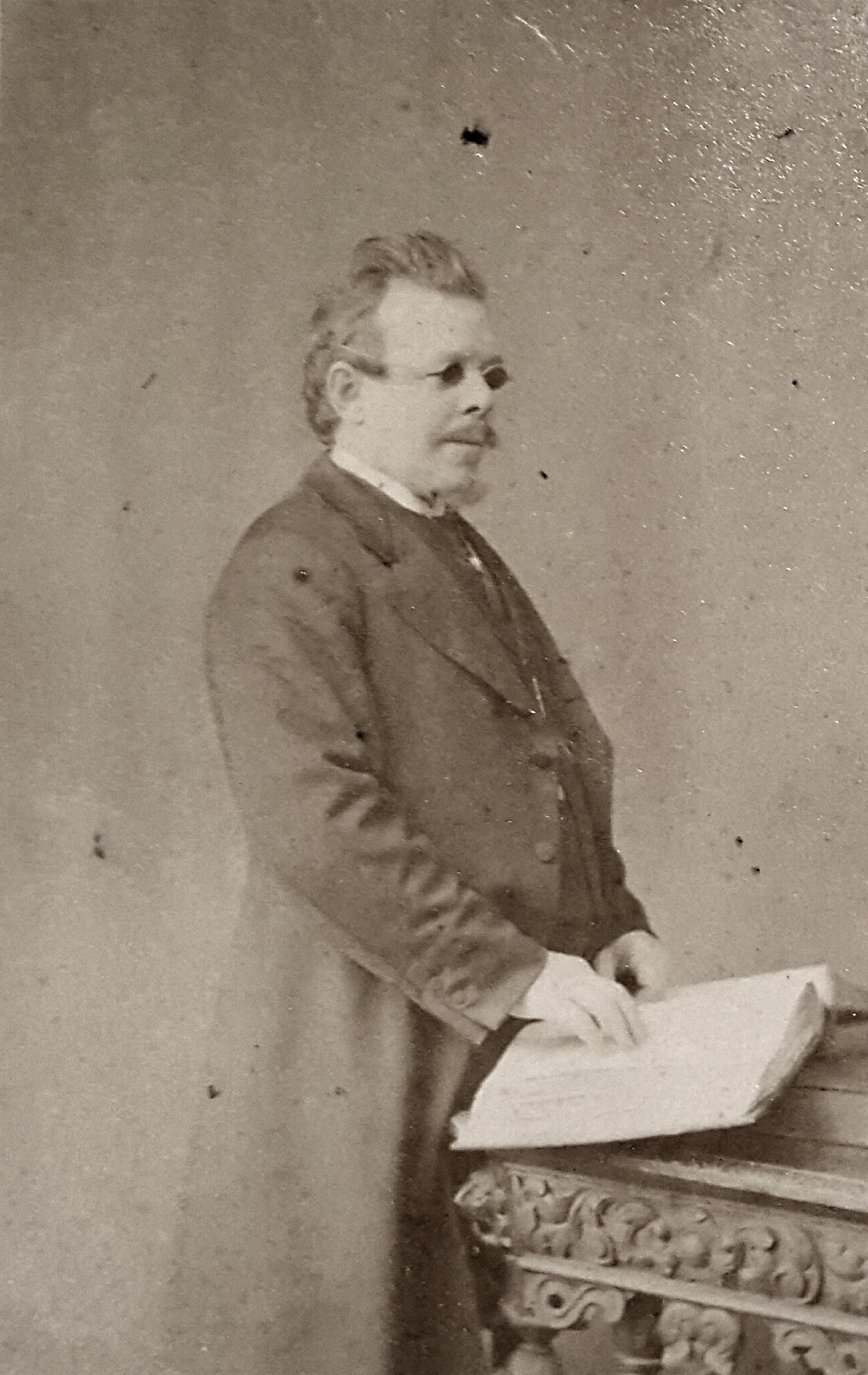
- Portrait of William Moon, albumen print, frontispiece, Light for the Blind, c. 1870
- Born: 18 December 1818; Horsmonden, Kent, England
- Died: 9 October 1894 (aged 75); Brighton, England
- Resting place: Extra-Mural Cemetery, Brighton, East Sussex, England
- Occupations: Teacher, Philanthropist
- Known for: inventing Moon type
- Spouse: Mary Ann Caudle
- Children: Robert, Adelaide
- Awards: FRGS (1852), FRSA (1857), Hon. LLD (Philadelphia, 1871)

William Moon (18 December 1818 – 9 October 1894) was an Englishman who created Moon type, the first widely used practical reading alphabet for the blind.

== Life and career ==
Moon was born in Horsmonden, Kent. As a small child, he lost sight in one eye from scarlet fever, and by the age of twenty-one he had become totally blind. He moved in with his widowed mother and sister in Brighton, East Sussex. He became a teacher, and taught boys how to read using the existing embossed reading codes.

Moon realised that the boys found these reading codes difficult to learn. He devised a new system, Moon type, based on a simplified Latin alphabet, which he designed to be easier to learn. He first formulated his ideas in 1843 and they were published in 1845. Moon type was subsequently replaced in popularity by Braille but it is still important for people who have difficulty reading Braille.

Moon achieved several distinctions during his lifetime: he was elected to fellowships of the Royal Geographical Society and the Royal Society of Arts in 1852 and 1857 respectively; he was also awarded an honorary LLD degree by the University of Philadelphia in 1871.

== Family ==
Moon was twice married, in 1843 to Mary Ann Caudle, daughter of a Brighton surgeon, who died in 1864; and in 1866 to Anna Maria Elsdale, a granddaughter of William Leeves, the composer of 'Auld Robin Gray'. By the first marriage he had a son, Robert Charles Moon, who was of great assistance to him in arranging his type to foreign languages, and was as of 1901 a physician in Philadelphia; and a daughter, who was as of 1901 superintending the undertaking that Moon inaugurated.

== Sources ==
This article incorporates text from a publication now in the public domain: Davey, Henry (1901). "Moon, William". In Lee, Sidney (ed.). Dictionary of National Biography (1st supplement). London: Smith, Elder & Co.

== Bibliography ==
- Day, Lance & McNeil, Ian (editors). 1995. Biographical Dictionary of the History of Technology. Routledge.
- Farrell, Gabriel (1956). The Story of Blindness. Cambridge: Harvard University Press. OCLC 263655.
