= Conrad Eckhard =

German physiologist

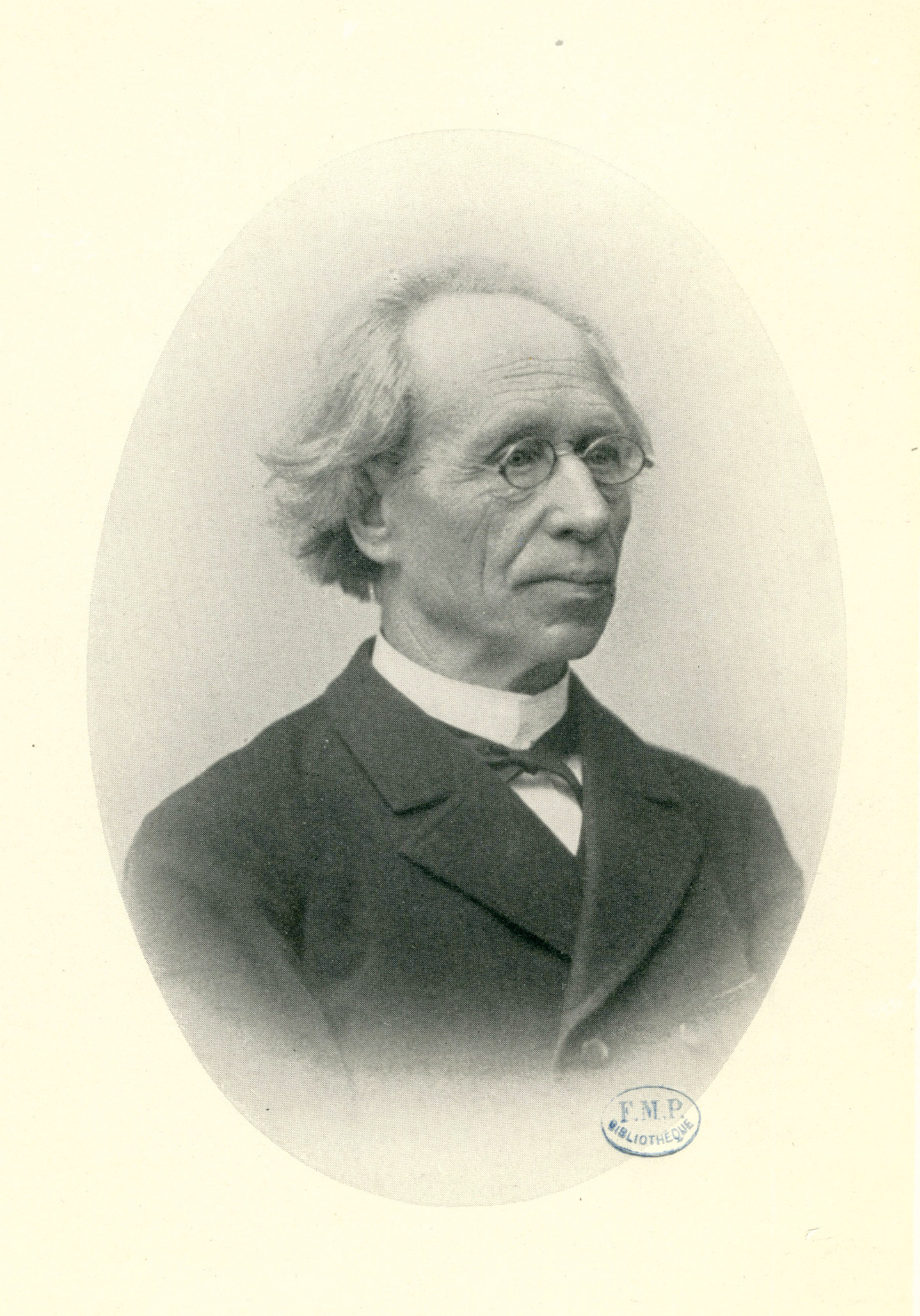
Conrad Eckhard

Conrad Eckhard (1 March 1822 – 28 April 1905) was a German physiologist born in Homberg (Efze), Electorate of Hesse.

He studied medicine in Berlin and Marburg, and from 1848 served as a prosector under Franz Ludwig Fick (1813–1858) and as an assistant to Carl Ludwig (1816–1895) in Marburg. In 1850 he moved to Giessen, where he worked as a prosector and assistant to Theodor Ludwig Wilhelm Bischoff (1807–1882). From 1855 to 1891 he was an associate professor of physiology and anatomy at the University of Giessen. From 1858 to 1888 he was editor of Beiträge zur Anatomie and Physiologie.

Eckhard is remembered for pioneer research of motor (myotomes) and sensory (dermatomes) projections of nerve roots. He also made contributions in his investigations towards olfaction in amphibians, and in his studies on the erector mechanism of the canine penis.

== Selected writings ==
- Grundzüge der Physiologie des Nervensystems (Outlines on the Physiology of the Nervous System), 1854
- Lehrbuch der Anatomie des Menschen (Textbook on the Anatomy of Humans), 1862
- Experimentalphysiologie des Nervensystems (Experimental Physiology of the Nervous System), 1867
