= Laurence–Moon syndrome =

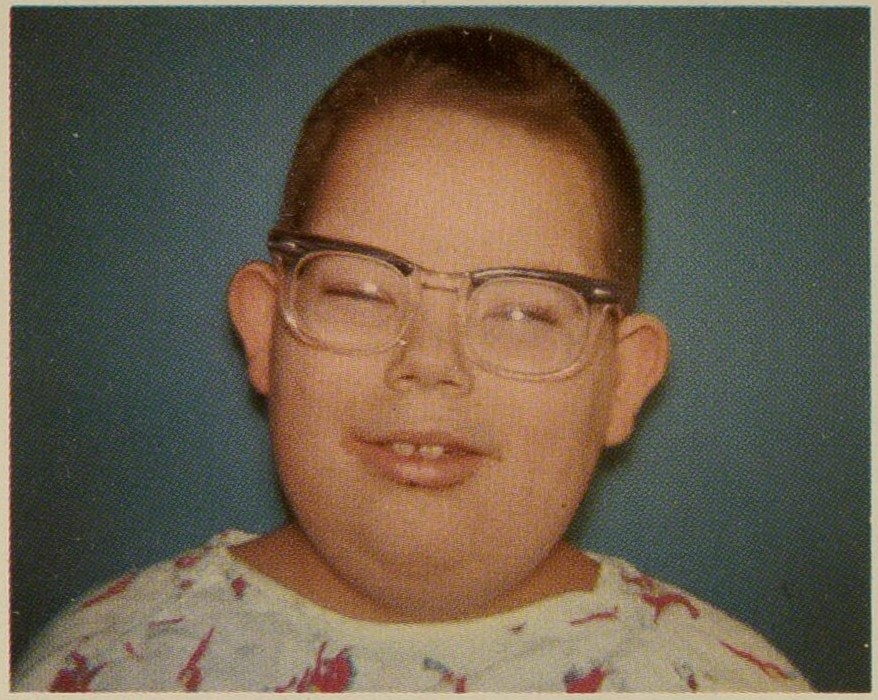
- Boy with Laurence-Moon syndrome
- Specialty: Medical genetics

Laurence–Moon syndrome (LMS) is a rare autosomal recessive genetic disorder associated with retinitis pigmentosa, spastic paraplegia, and mental disabilities.

== Signs and symptoms ==
Intellectual disability, hexadactyly, central diabetes insipidus, blindness (usually by 30 years due to central retinal degeneration).

== Genetics ==
Autosomal recessive inheritance

LMS is inherited in an autosomal recessive manner. This means the defective gene responsible for the disorder is located on an autosome, and two copies of the defective gene (one inherited from each parent) are required in order to be born with the disorder. The parents of an individual with an autosomal recessive disorder both carry one copy of the defective gene, but usually do not experience any signs or symptoms of the disorder.

== Diagnosis ==
The syndrome was originally thought to have five cardinal features (and recently a sixth was added), on the basis of which a diagnostic criterion was developed: 4 primary features or 3 primary features and 2 secondary features must be present.

The primary features are:

1. Polydactyly
2. Rod-cone dystrophy
3. Learning disabilities
4. Obesity
5. Hypogonadism in males
6. Renal abnormalities

While the secondary features are stated to be as:

1. Speech disorder and/or developmental delay
2. Ophthalmic abnormalities other than rod-cone dystrophy (strabismus, cataract, astigmatism etc.)
3. Brachydactyly or Syndactyly
4. Polyuria and/or polydipsia (nephrogenic diabetes insipidus)
5. Ataxia, poor coordination, imbalance
6. Mild spasticity (especially lower limbs)
7. Diabetes mellitus
8. Dental crowding, hypodontia, small roots, high arched palate
9. Congenital heart disease
10. Hepatic fibrosis

== Treatment ==
There is no cure to LNMS. However, symptomatic treatment is often provided. The patients with LNMS often experience ataxia, spasticity and contractures, restricting their movements and daily activities. Therefore, multi-disciplinary approach is required including physical therapies, psychiatric and ophthalmologic consultations, nutrition and well-balanced diet. Physical therapy aims at improving the strength and ability using assisting tools such as ankle-foot orthotic braces, weight-bearing walkers and regular exercise.

== Eponym and nomenclature ==
It is named after the physicians John Zachariah Laurence and Robert Charles Moon who provided the first formal description of the condition in a paper published in 1866. In the past, LMS has also been referred to as Laurence–Moon–Bardet–Biedl or Laurence–Moon–Biedl–Bardet syndrome, but Bardet–Biedl syndrome (BBS) is now usually recognized as a separate entity.

Recent advances in genetic typing of the phenotypically-wide variation in patients clinically diagnosed with either Bardet-Biedl syndrome (BBS) or Laurence-Moon syndrome (LMS) have questioned whether LMS and BBS are genetically distinct. For example, a 1999 epidemiological study of BBS and LMS reported that "BBS proteins interact and are necessary for the development of many organs." "Two patients [in the study] were diagnosed clinically as LMS but both had mutations in a BBS gene. The features in this population do not support the notion that BBS and LMS are distinct." A more recent 2005 paper also suggests that the two conditions are not distinct.
