= Experimental pathology =

Scientific study of disease

Experimental pathology, also known as investigative pathology, is the scientific study of disease processes through the microscopic or molecular examination of organs, tissues, cells, or body fluids from diseased organisms. It is closely related, both historically and in modern academic settings, to the medical field of pathology.
