= Petroleomics =

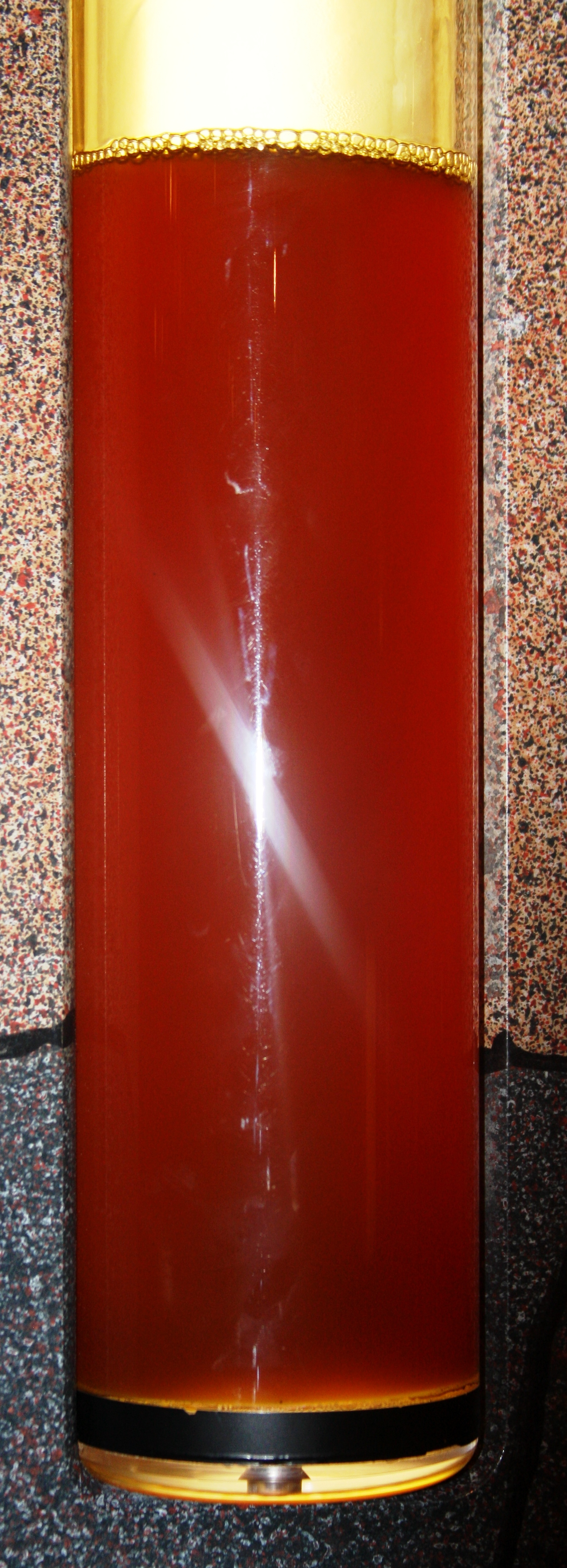
Petroleomics is the chemical characterization of petroleum such as this sample of North Sea crude oil.

Petroleomics is the identification of the totality of the constituents of naturally occurring petroleum and crude oil using high resolution mass spectrometry. In addition to mass determination, petroleomic analysis sorts the chemical compounds into heteroatom class (nitrogen, oxygen and sulfur), type (degree of unsaturation), and carbon number. The name is a combination of petroleum and -omics (collective chemical characterization and quantification).

== History ==
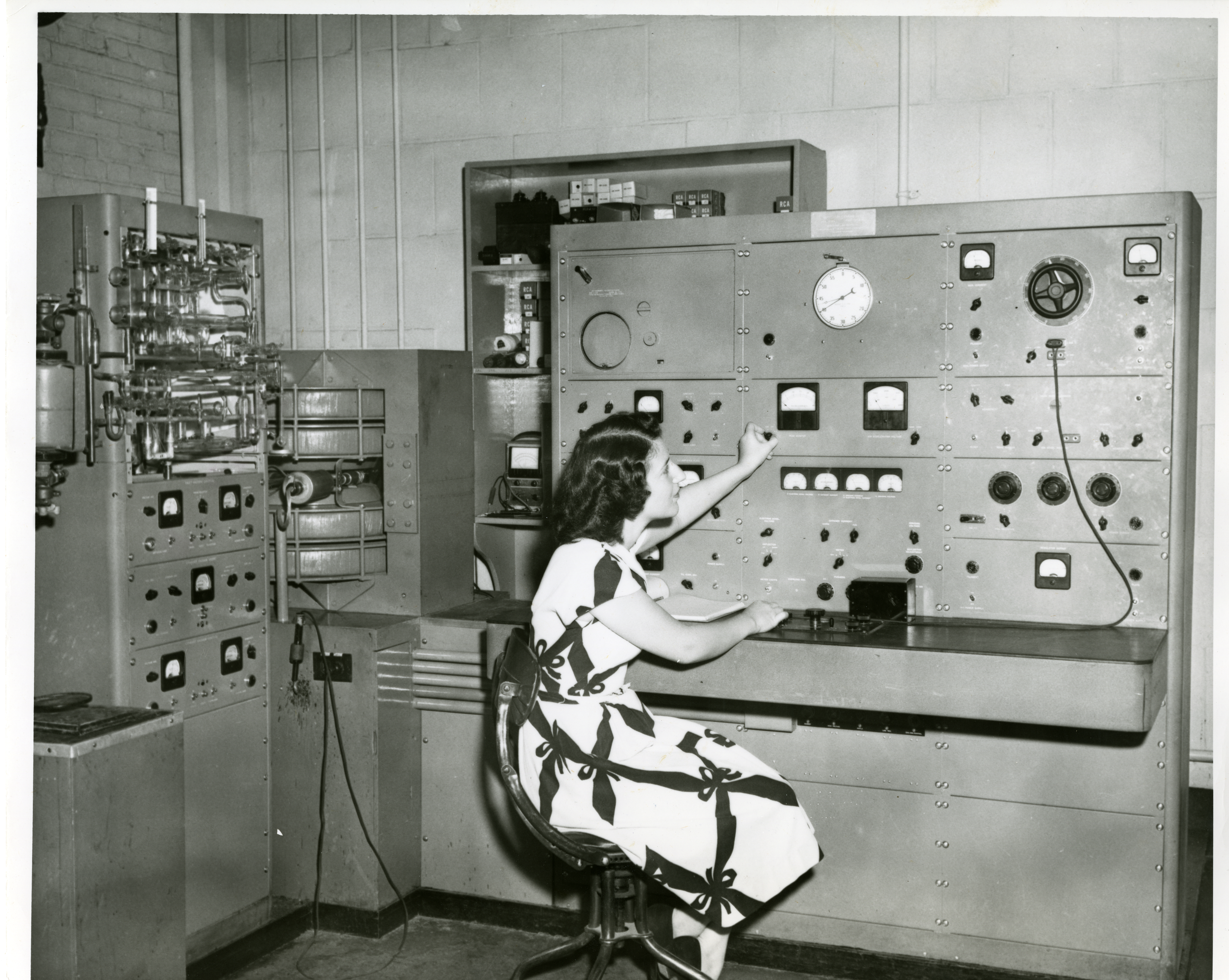
A gas chromatography-mass spectrometer at the National Bureau of Standards in 1948.

Mass spectrometry characterization of petroleum has been performed since the first commercial mass spectrometers were introduced in the 1940s. Early mass spectrometry was limited to relatively low molecular weight nonpolar species accessed mainly by electron ionization with mass analysis with sector mass spectrometers. By the end of the 20th century, separations combined with mass spectrometric techniques such as gas chromatography-mass spectrometry and liquid chromatography mass spectrometry have characterizated petroleum distillates such as gasoline, diesel, and gas oil.

The first petroleum analysis with electrospray ionization was demonstrated in 2000 by Zhan and Fenn, who studied the polar species in petroleum distillates with low-resolution MS. Electrospray ionization was coupled with high-resolution FT-ICR by Marshall and coworkers. To date, many studies on petroleomic analysis of crude oils have been published. Most work has been done by the group of Marshall at the National High Magnetic Field Laboratory (NHMFL) and Florida State University.

== Ionization methods ==
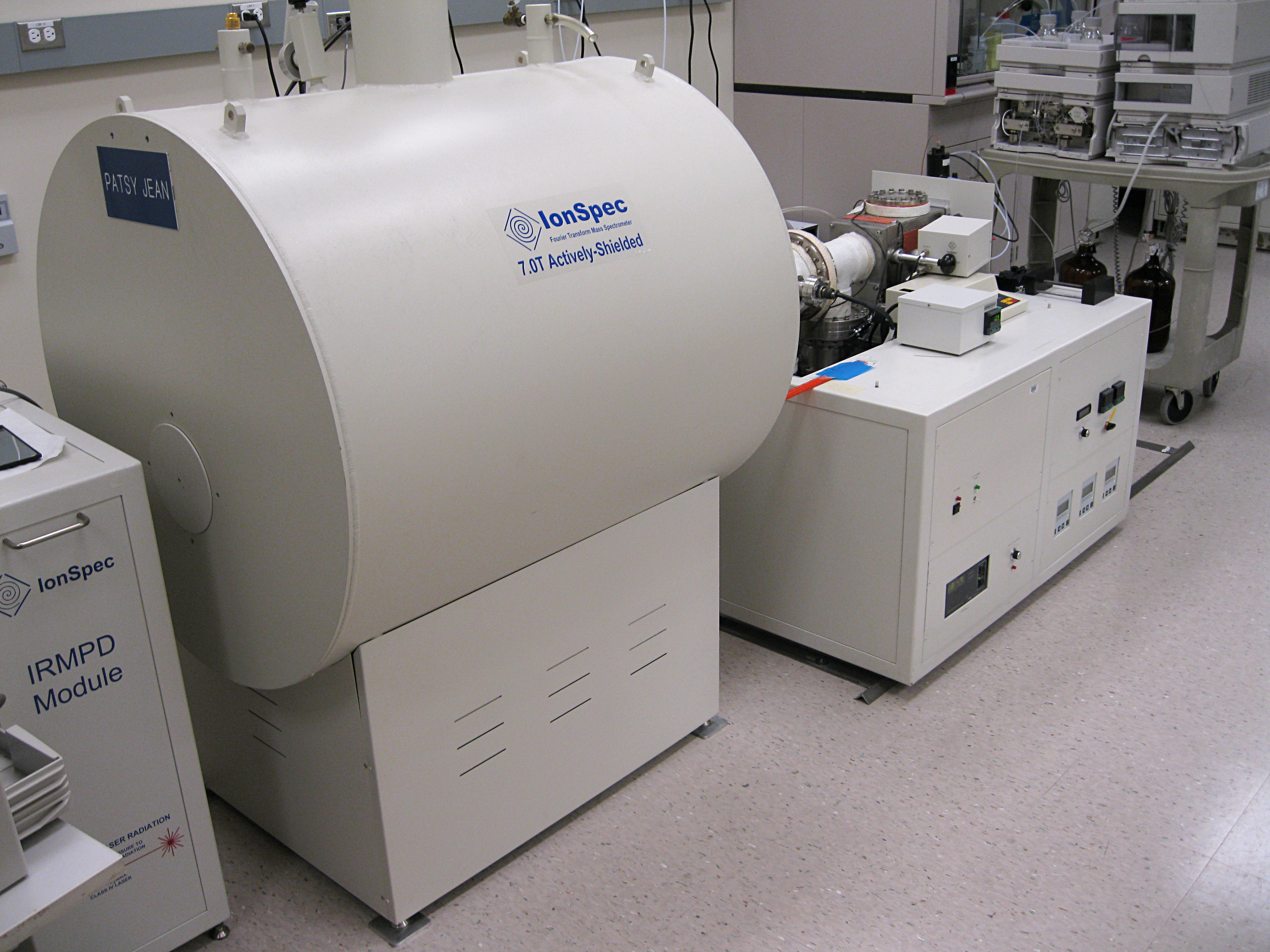
A high resolution FTICR mass spectrometer is often used for petroleomics.

Ionization of nonpolar petroleum components can be achieved by field desorption ionization and atmospheric pressure photoionization (APPI). field desorption FT-ICR MS has enabled the identification of a large number of nonpolar components in crude oils that are not accessible by electrospray, such as benzo- and dibenzothiophenes, furans, cycloalkanes, and polycyclic aromatic hydrocarbons (PAHs). A drawback of field desorption is that it is slow, mainly due to the need of ramping the current to the emitter in order to volatilize and ionize molecules. APPI can ionize both polar and nonpolar species, and an APPI spectrum can be generated in just a few seconds. However, APPI ionizes a broad range of compound classes and produces both protonated and molecular ion peaks, resulting in a complex mass spectrum.

== Kendrick analysis ==
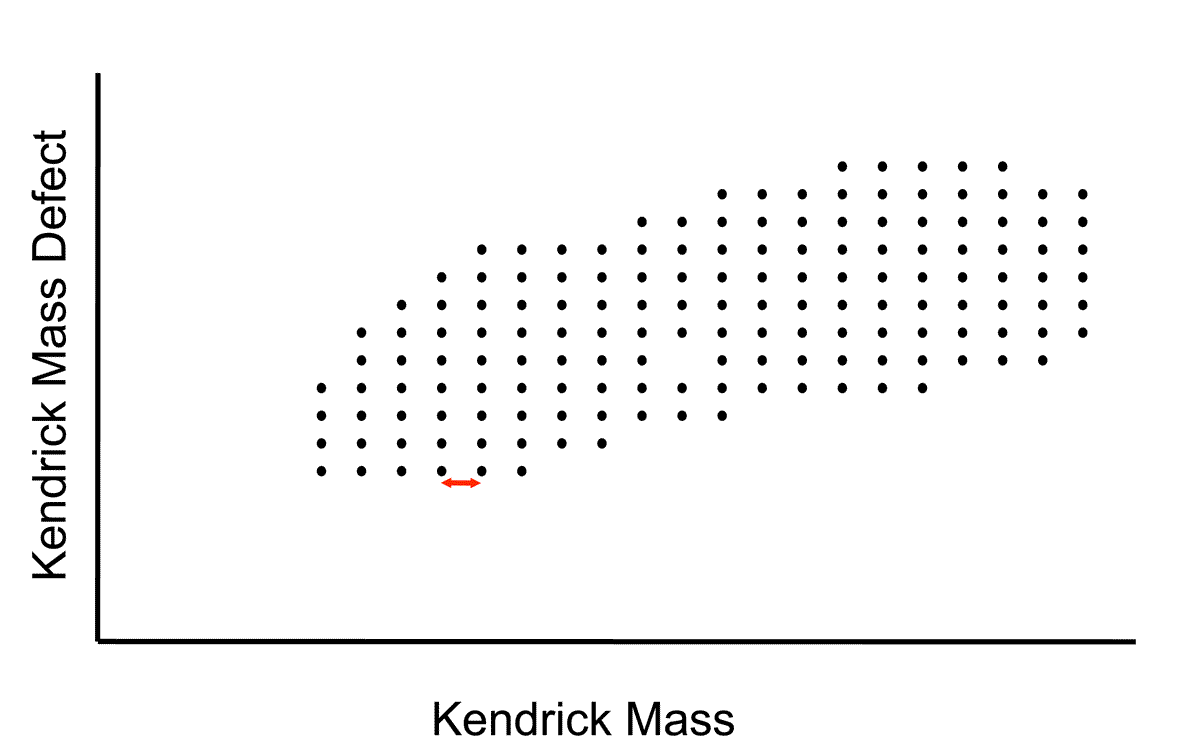
Plot of Kendrick mass defect as function of Kendrick mass; horizontal lines indicate common repeat units. Each dot in the plot corresponds to a peak measured in a mass spectrum.

High mass resolution data analysis is usually undertaken by converting the mass spectra to the Kendrick mass scale, in which the mass of a methylene unit is set to exactly 14 (CH_{2} = 14.0000 instead of 14.01565 daltons). This rescaling of the data aids in the identification of homologous series according to alkylation, class (number of heteroatoms), and type (double bond equivalent, DBE, also called rings plus double bonds or degree of unsaturation). The scaled data is then used to obtain the Kendrick mass defect (KMD), which is given by

$$\textrm{Kendrick~mass~defect}= \textrm{nominal~Kendrick~mass} - \textrm{Kendrick~mass}$$

where the nominal Kendrick is the Kendrick mass rounded to the nearest integer. Double bond equivalent (DBE) is calculated according to

$$Rings + \pi Bonds = C - \frac{H}{2} - \frac{X}{2} + \frac{N}{2}+1\,$$

where C = number of carbons, H = number of hydrogens, X= number of halogens and N = number of nitrogens. O

Compounds with the same DBE have the same mass defect. Therefore, Kendrick normalization yields a set of series with identical mass defect that appear as horizontal rows in a plot of DBE versus Kendrick mass. The data can also be plotted as a 3D heat-map to indicate the relative intensity of the mass spectral peaks. From the Kendrick plot, the species with peaks in the mass spectrum can be sorted into compound classes by the number of nitrogen, oxygen and sulfur heteroatoms.

The data can also be represented with a Van Krevelen diagram.

== See also ==
- Orbitrap
