= Monoisotopic mass =

Type of molecular mass

Monoisotopic mass (M_{mi}) is one of several types of molecular masses used in mass spectrometry.The theoretical monoisotopic mass of a molecule is computed by taking the sum of the accurate masses (including mass defect) of the most abundant naturally occurring stable isotope of each atom in the molecule. It is also called the (theoretical) exact mass. This differs from the nominal molecular mass, which is the sum of the mass number of the primary isotope of each atom in the molecule and is an integer. It also is different from the molar mass or the average molecular weight, which uses the (abundance-weighted) average atomic masses.

For small molecules made up of low-atomic-number elements, the monoisotopic mass is observable as a peak in a mass spectrum. For some atoms like carbon, oxygen, hydrogen, nitrogen, and sulfur, the M_{mi} of these elements is exactly the same as the mass of its lightest isotope. However, this does not hold true for all atoms. Iron's most common isotope has a mass number of 56, while the stable isotopes of iron vary in mass number from 54 to 58. Monoisotopic mass is typically expressed in daltons (Da).

== Background ==
The monoisotopic mass is not used frequently in fields outside of mass spectrometry because other fields cannot distinguish molecules of different isotopic composition. For this reason, mostly the average molecular mass or even more commonly the molar mass is used. For most purposes such as weighing out bulk chemicals only the molar mass is relevant since what one is weighing is a statistical distribution of varying isotopic compositions.

This concept is most helpful in mass spectrometry because individual molecules (or atoms, as in ICP-MS) are measured, and not their statistical average as a whole. Since mass spectrometry is often used for quantifying trace-level compounds, maximizing the sensitivity of the analysis is usually desired. By choosing to look for the most abundant isotopic version of a molecule, the analysis is likely to be most sensitive, which enables even smaller amounts of the target compounds to be quantified. Therefore, the concept is very useful to analysts looking for trace-level residues of organic molecules, such as pesticide residue in foods and agricultural products.

Isotopic masses can play an important role in physics, but physics less often deals with molecules. Molecules differing by an isotope are sometimes distinguished from one another in molecular spectroscopy or related fields; however, it is usually a single isotope change on a larger molecule that can be observed rather than the isotopic composition of an entire molecule. The isotopic substitution changes the vibrational frequencies of various bonds in the molecule, which can have observable effects on the chemical reactivity via the kinetic isotope effect, and even by extension the biological activity in some cases.

== Isotopic abundance ==
The monoisotopic peak is sometimes not observable for two primary reasons. First, the monoisotopic peak may not be resolved from the other isotopic peaks. In this case, only the average molecular mass may be observed. In some cases, even when the isotopic peaks are resolved, such as with a high-resolution mass spectrometer, the monoisotopic peak may be below the noise level and higher isotopes may dominate completely.

If a piece of iron was put into a mass spectrometer to be analyzed, the mass spectra of iron (Fe) would result in multiple mass spectral peaks due to the existence of the iron isotopes, ^{54}Fe, ^{56}Fe, ^{57}Fe, ^{58}Fe. The mass spectrum of Fe represents that the monoisotopic mass is not always the most abundant isotopic peak in a spectrum despite it containing the most abundant isotope for each atom. This is because as the number of atoms in a molecule increases, the probability that the molecule contains at least one heavy isotope atom also increases. If there are 100 carbon atoms ^{12}C in a molecule, and each carbon has a probability of approximately 1% of being a heavy isotope ^{13}C, the whole molecule is highly likely to contain at least one heavy isotope atom of carbon-13 and the most abundant isotopic composition will no longer be the same as the monoisotopic peak.

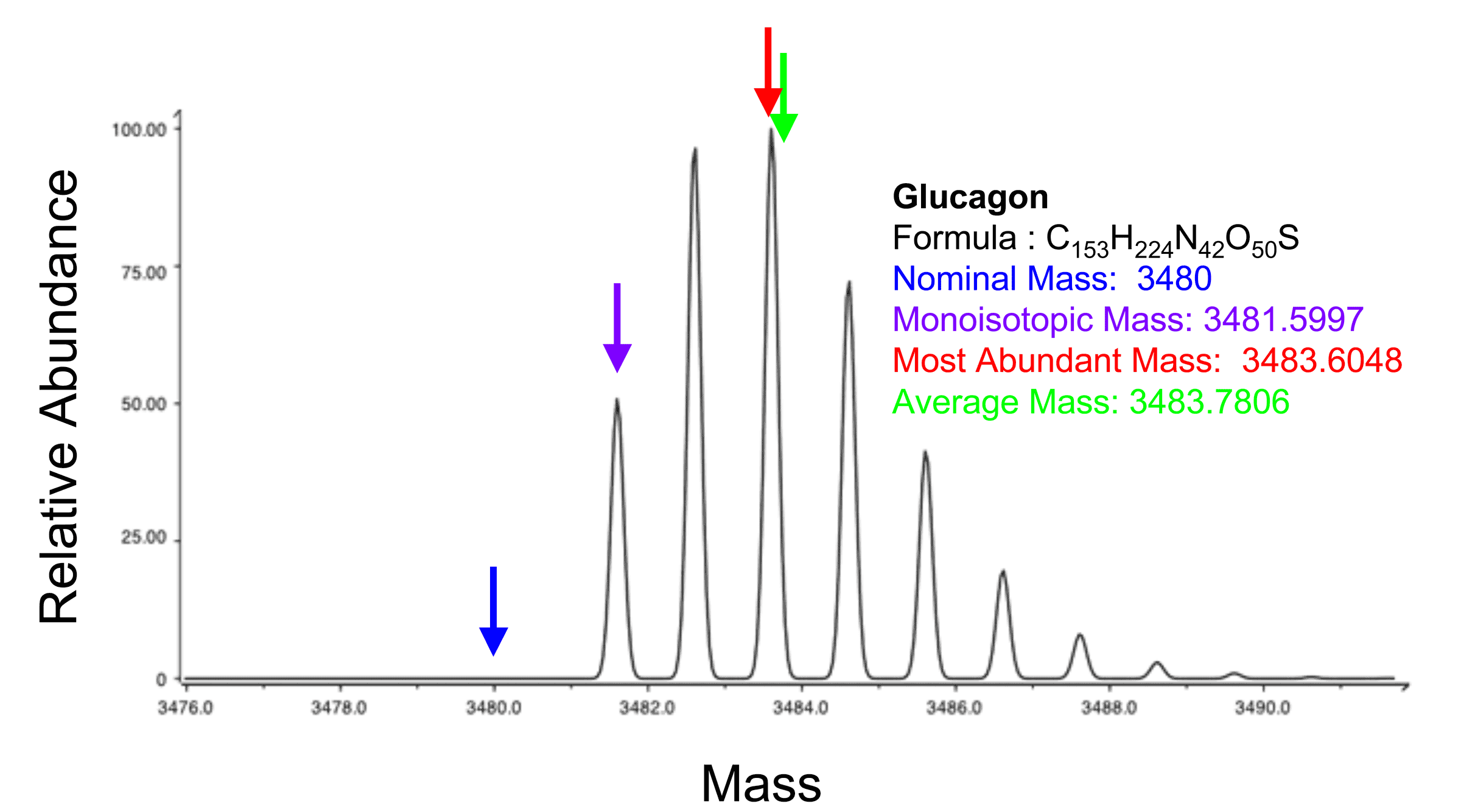
Theoretical isotope distribution for the molecular ion of glucagon (C_{153}H_{224}N_{42}O_{50}S)

Because isotopes differ in mass from each other by a nearly integer amount of Da, the many isotopic peaks tend to group into so-called isotopometric clusters in a mass spectrum, with each cluster smearing into one peak. For large molecules, this most abundant peak may be different from the monoisotopic peak, and can be calculated using either a full prediction of all peaks (using the natural abundances) or approximately to integer precision using pre-calculated tables derived from a binomial distribution.

== Examples ==
The following examples calculate the nominal and monoisotopic masses of a molecule of nitrogen (N_{2}) and ethylene (C_{2}H_{4}). For these elements the most abundant isotopes are ^{12}C, ^{1}H, and ^{14}N.

Nominal and nuclide masses of ^{12}C, ^{1}H, and ^{14}N
Most abundant nuclide	Nuclide mass (Da)	Nominal mass (mass number)
^{12}C	12.0000	12
^{1}H	1.0078	1
^{14}N	14.0031	14

To calculate the nominal molecular masses we add the mass numbers together:

- N_{2}: (2×14) = 28 Da
- C_{2}H_{4}: (2×12)+(4×1) = 28 Da

To calculate the monoisotopic masses we add the masses of the most abundant isotopes together (including mass defect):

- N_{2}: (2×14.0031) = 28.0062 Da
- C_{2}H_{4}: (2×12.0000)+(4×1.0078) = 28.0312 Da

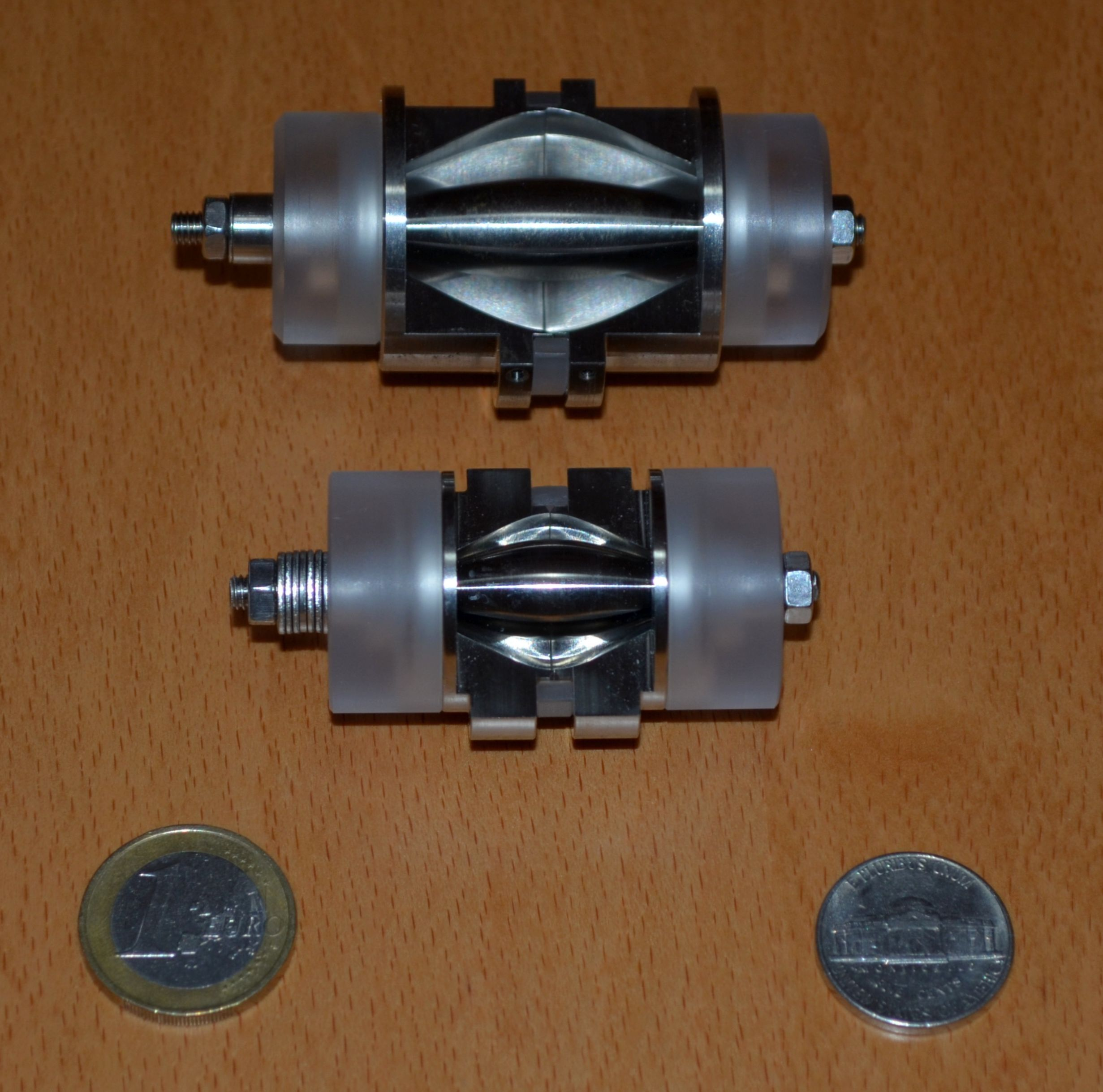
Orbitrap Mass Analyzers

A mass spectrometer resolves the m/z of particles, where m is the accurate mass. As one can glance from the monoisotopic masses, the two molecules are very close in weight. When using a insufficiently powerful mass spectrometer such as a quadrupole mass analyser or a quadrupolar ion trap, the two molecules will show their m/z peaks blended together into one peak. If a high-resolution instrument like an orbitrap or an ion cyclotron resonance is used, these two molecules can be distinguished.

The nominal mass is much easier to calculate than the exact monoisotopic mass and serves as an approximation of it. When two particles have the same nominal mass, their monoisotopic masses are usually too close to each other to be resolved using low-resolution instrument.

The added precision of monoisotopic mass is very useful when analyzing small organic compounds since compounds with similar weights will not be differentiated if the nominal mass is used. For example, when comparing tyrosine which has a molecular structure of C_{9}H_{11}NO_{3} with a monoisotopic mass of 182.081 Da and methionine sulphone C_{5}H_{11}NO_{4}S which clearly are 2 different compounds but methionine sulphone has a 182.048 Da.

== See also ==
- Mass (mass spectrometry)
- Molecular mass
- Dalton (unit)
- Mass number
