= Mass spectral interpretation =

Method of identifying trace chemicals

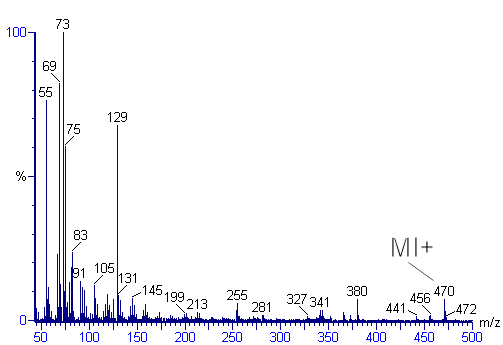
Electron ionization mass spectrum of the steroid alcohol brassicasterol

Mass spectral interpretation is the method employed to identify the chemical formula, characteristic fragment patterns and possible fragment ions from the mass spectra. Mass spectra is a plot of relative abundance against mass-to-charge ratio. It is commonly used for the identification of organic compounds from electron ionization mass spectrometry. Organic chemists obtain mass spectra of chemical compounds as part of structure elucidation and the analysis is part of many organic chemistry curricula.

== Mass spectra generation ==
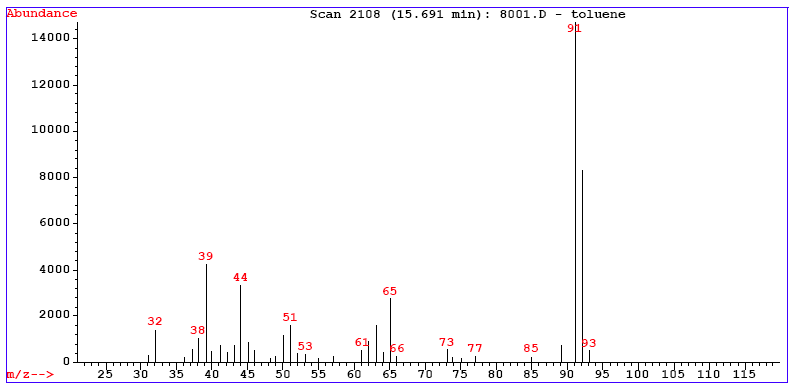
The mass spectrum for toluene has around 30 peaks.

Electron ionization (EI) is a type of mass spectrometer ion source in which a beam of electrons interacts with a gas phase molecule M to form an ion according to

$$M + e^- \to M^{+\bullet} + 2e^-$$

with a molecular ion $M^{+\bullet}$. The superscript "+" indicates the ion charge and the superscript "•" indicates an unpaired electron of the radical ion. The energy of the electron beam is typically 70 electronvolts and the ionization process typically produces extensive fragmentation of the chemical bonds of the molecule.

Due to the high vacuum pressure in the ionization chamber, the mean free path of molecules are varying from 10 cm to 1 km and then the fragmentations are unimolecular processes. Once the fragmentation is initiated, the electron is first excited from the site with the lowest ionization energy. Since the order of the electron energy is non-bonding electrons > pi bond electrons > sigma bond electrons, the order of ionization preference is non-bonding electrons > pi bond electrons > sigma bond electrons.

Several toluene fragmentation peaks can be rationalized in this fragmentation pattern

The peak in the mass spectrum with the greatest intensity is called the base peak. The peak corresponding to the molecular ion is often, but not always, the base peak. Identification of the molecular ion can be difficult. Examining organic compounds, the relative intensity of the molecular ion peak diminishes with branching and with increasing mass in a homologous series. In the spectrum for toluene for example, the molecular ion peak is located at 92 m/z corresponding to its molecular mass. Molecular ion peaks are also often preceded by an M-1 or M-2 peak resulting from loss of a hydrogen radical or dihydrogen, respectively. Here, M refers to the molecular mass of the compound. In the spectrum for toluene, a hydrogen radical (proton-electron pair) is lost, forming the M-1 (91) peak.

Peaks with mass less than the molecular ion are the result of fragmentation of the molecule. Many reaction pathways exist for fragmentation, but only newly formed cations will show up in the mass spectrum, not radical fragments or neutral fragments. Metastable peaks are broad peaks with low intensity at non-integer mass values. These peaks result from ions with lifetimes shorter than the time needed to traverse the distance between ionization chamber and the detector.

== Molecular formula determination ==
=== Nitrogen rule ===
The nitrogen rule states that organic molecules that contain hydrogen, carbon, nitrogen, oxygen, silicon, phosphorus, sulfur, or the halogens have an odd nominal mass if they have an odd number of nitrogen atoms or an even mass if they have an even number of nitrogen atoms are present. The nitrogen rule is true for structures in which all of the atoms in the molecule have a number of covalent bonds equal to their standard valency, counting each sigma bond and pi bond as a separate covalent bond.

=== Rings rule ===
From degree of unsaturation principles, molecules containing only carbon, hydrogen, halogens, nitrogen, and oxygen follow the formula

$$\text{Rings} + \pi\text{-Bonds} = u = C - \frac{H}{2} - \frac{X}{2} + \frac{N}{2}+1\,$$

where C is the number of carbons, H is the number of hydrogens, X is the number of halogens, and N is the number of nitrogen.

=== Even electron rule ===
The even electron rule states that ions with an even number of electrons (cations but not radical ions) tend to form even-electron fragment ions and odd-electron ions (radical ions) form odd-electron ions or even-electron ions. Even-electron species tend to fragment to another even-electron cation and a neutral molecule rather than two odd-electron species.

OE^{+•}→EE^{+}+ R^{•}, OE^{+•}→OE^{+•}+ N

=== Stevenson's rules ===
The more stable the product cation, the more abundant the corresponding decomposition process. Several theories can be utilized to predict the fragmentation process, such as the electron octet rule, the resonance stabilization and hyperconjugation and so on.

=== Rule of 13 ===
The Rule of 13 is a simple procedure for tabulating possible chemical formula for a given molecular mass. The first step in applying the rule is to assume that only carbon and hydrogen are present in the molecule and that the molecule comprises some number of CH "units" each of which has a nominal mass of 13. If the molecular weight of the molecule in question is M, the number of possible CH units is n and

$$\frac{M}{13} = n + \frac{r}{13}\,$$

where r is the remainder. The base formula for the molecule is

$$C_{n}H_{n+r} \,$$

and the degree of unsaturation is

$$u = \frac{ \left ( n - r + 2 \right )}{2}\,$$

A negative value of u indicates the presence of heteroatoms in the molecule and a half-integer value of u indicates the presence of an odd number of nitrogen atoms. On addition of heteroatoms, the molecular formula is adjusted by the equivalent mass of carbon and hydrogen. For example, adding N requires removing CH_{2} and adding O requires removing CH_{4}.

=== Isotope effects ===
Isotope peaks within a spectrum can help in structure elucidation. Compounds containing halogens (especially chlorine and bromine) can produce very distinct isotope peaks. The mass spectrum of methylbromide has two prominent peaks of equal intensity at m/z 94 (M) and 96 (M+2) and then two more at 79 and 81 belonging to the bromine fragment.

Even when compounds only contain elements with less intense isotope peaks (carbon or oxygen), the distribution of these peaks can be used to assign the spectrum to the correct compound. For example, two compounds with identical mass of 150 Da, C_{8}H_{12}N_{3}^{+} and C_{9}H_{10}O_{2}^{+}, will have two different M+2 intensities which makes it possible to distinguish between them.

== Fragmentation ==
The fragmentation pattern of the spectra beside the determination of the molar weight of an unknown compound also suitable to give structural information, especially in combination with the calculation of the degree of unsaturation from the molecular formula (when available). Neutral fragments frequently lost are carbon monoxide, ethylene, water, ammonia, and hydrogen sulfide. There are several fragmentation processes, as follows.

=== α - cleavage ===
Fragmentation arises from a homolysis processes. This cleavage results from the tendency of the unpaired electron from the radical site to pair up with an electron from another bond to an atom adjacent to the charge site, as illustrated below. This reaction is defined as a homolytic cleavage since only a single electron is transferred. The driving forces for such reaction is the electron donating abilities of the radical sites: N > S, O,π > Cl, Br > H. An example is the cleavage of carbon-carbon bonds next to a heteroatom. In this depiction, single-electron movements are indicated by a single-headed arrow.

fragmentation at heteroatom

=== Sigma bond cleavage ===
The ionization of alkanes weakens the C-C bond, ultimately resulting in the decomposition. As the bond breaks, a charged, even electron species (R+) and a neutral radical species (R•) are generated. Highly substituted carbocations are more stable than the nonsubstituted ones. An example is depicted below.

Sigma bond cleavage of an alkane.

=== Inductive cleavage ===
This reaction results from the inductive effect of the radical sites, as depicted below. This reaction is defined as a heterolytic cleavage since a pair of electrons is transferred. The driving forces for such reaction are the electronegativities of the radical sites: halogens > O, S >> N, C. this reaction is less favored than radical-site reactions.

=== McLafferty rearrangement ===
The McLafferty rearrangement can occur in a molecule containing a keto-group and involves β-cleavage, with the gain of the γ-hydrogen atom. Ion-neutral complex formation involves bond homolysis or bond heterolysis, in which the fragments do not have enough kinetic energy to separate and, instead, reaction with one another like an ion-molecule reaction.

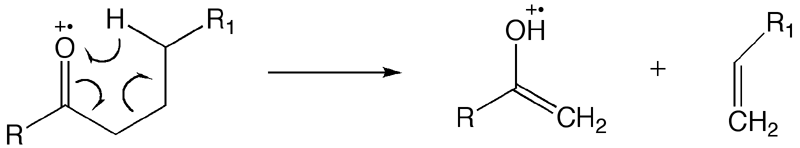
An example of the McLafferty rearrangement

=== Hydrogen rearrangement to a saturated heteroatom ===
The “1,5 ” hydrogen shift cause transfer of one γ- hydrogen to a radical site on a saturated heteroatom. The same requirements for McLafferty rearrangement apply to hydrogen rearrangement to a saturated heteroatom. Such rearrangement initiates charge-site reaction, resulting in the formation of an odd electron ion and a small neutral molecule ( water, or acid and so on). For alcohols, this heterolytic cleavage releases a water molecule. Since the charge-site reactions are dominant in the less bulky alcohols, this reaction is favored for alcohols as primary > secondary > tertiary.

=== Double-hydrogen rearrangement ===
The “1,5 ” hydrogen shift cause transfer of two γ- hydrogen to two radical sites on two different unsaturated atoms. The same requirements for McLafferty rearrangement apply to double-hydrogen rearrangement. This reaction is observed for three unsaturated functional groups, namely thioesters, esters and amides.

=== Ortho rearrangement ===
The “1,5 ” hydrogen shift cause transfer of two γ- hydrogen to two radical sites on two different unsaturated atoms. The same requirements for The “1,5 ” hydrogen shift occur between proper substituents in the ortho positions of the aromatic rings. The same requirements for McLafferty rearrangement apply to ortho rearrangement except for the strong α,β carbon-carbon double bond. Such rearrangement initiates charge-site reaction, resulting in the formation of an odd electron ion and a small neutral molecule ( water, or HCl and so on). This reaction can be utilized to differentiate ortho from para and meta isomersMcLafferty rearrangement apply to double-hydrogen rearrangement. This reaction is observed for three unsaturated functional groups, namely thioesters, esters and amides.

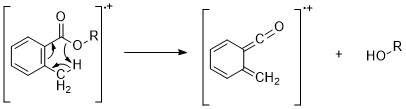
Ortho rearrangement

=== Retro-Diels-Alder reaction ===
This reaction occurs mainly in cyclohexene and its derivatives. Upon ionization, the pi electrons are excited and generate a charge site and a radical site. Following this, two successive α cleavages yield a butadiene radical and a neutral ethene since ethene has a higher ionisation energy than butadiene ( Stevenson's rules).

Retro Diels-Alder reaction producing neutral ethylene

=== Cycloelimination reaction ===
This reaction occurs mainly in four-membered cyclic molecules. Once ionized, it produces a distonic ion and then further fragments to yield an ethene radical ion and a neutral ethene molecule.

== Fragmentation patterns of specific compound classes ==
=== Alkanes ===
For linear alkanes, molecular ion peaks are often observed. However, for long chain compounds, the intensity of the molecular ion peaks are often weak. Linear fragments often differ by 14 Da (CH_{2} = 14). For example, hexane fragmentation patterns. The m/z=57 butyl cation is the base peak, and other most abundant peaks in the spectrum are alkyl carbocations at m/z=15, 29, 43 Da.

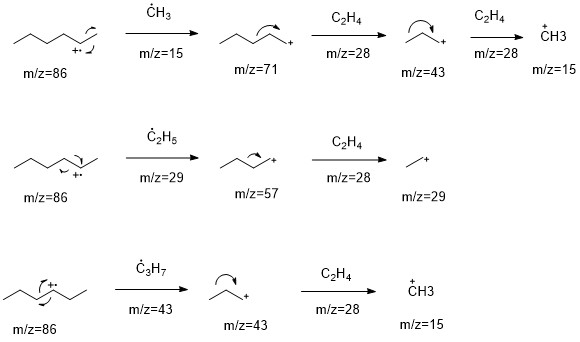
The possible mechanisms for EI ionization spectra of hexane

Branched alkanes have somewhat weaker molecular ion peaks in the spectra. They tend to fragment at the branched point. For the 2,3-dimethylbutane, an isopropyl cation peak (m/z=43) is very strong.

Branched alkane

Cycloalkanes have relatively intense molecular ion peaks (two bonds have to break). Alkene fragmentation peaks are often most significant mode. Loss of “CH_{2}CH_{2}“ (= 28) is common, if present. However, for the substituted cycloalkanes, they prefer to form the cycloalkyl cations by cleavage at the branched points.

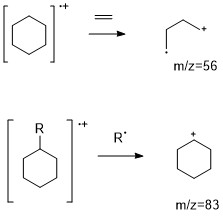

=== Alkenes ===
Alkenes often produce stronger molecular ion peaks than alkanes due to the lower ionization energy of a pi electron than a σ electron. After the ionization, double bonds can migrate easily, resulting in almost impossible determination of isomers. Allylic cleavage is most significant fragmentation mode due to resonance stabilization.

Most possible ionization mechanism of acyclic alkenes

McLafferty-like rearrangements are possible (similar to carbonyl pi bonds). Again, bond migration is possible.

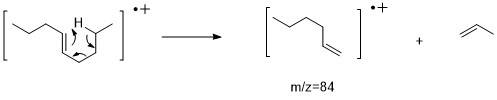
McLafferty-like rearrangements of alkenes

Cyclohexenes often undergo retro Diels-Alder reactions.

=== Alkynes ===
Similar to alkenes, alkynes often show strong molecular ion peak. Propargylic cleavage is a most significant fragmentation mode.

Most possible ionization mechanism of alkyne

=== Aromatic hydrocarbons ===
Aromatic hydrocarbons show distinct molecular ion peak.benzylic cleavage is pretty common. When alkyl groups are attached to the ring, a favorable mode of cleavage is to lose a H-radical to form the tropylium cation (m/z 91).

Benzylic cleavage

Alkyl substituted benzenes can fragment via the kinetic controlled process to form C_{6}H_{5}^{+}, C_{6}H_{6}^{+} ions.

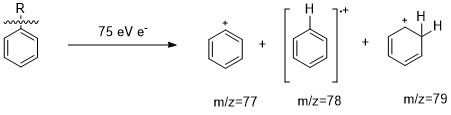
Benzene derivatives' fragmentation process

Another common mode of fragmentation is the McLafferty rearrangement, which requires the alkyl chain length to be at least longer than 3 carbons.

McLafferty rearrangement of aromatics

=== Alcohols ===
Alcohols generally have weak molecular ion peaks due to the strong electronegativity of oxygen. “Alpha” cleavage is common due to the resonance stabilization. The largest alkyl group will be lost.

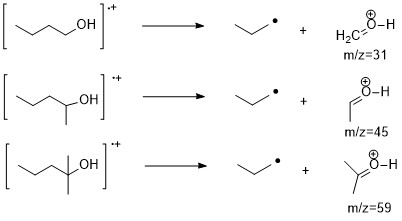
α-cleavage fragmentation mechanism of alcohols

Another common fragmentation mode is dehydration (M-18). For longer chain alcohols, a McLafferty type rearrangement can produce water and ethylene (M -46).

McLafferty type rearrangement for long chain alcohols

Cyclic alcohols tend to show stronger M+ peaks than linear chains. And they follow similar fragmentation pathways: Alpha cleavage and dehydration.

=== Phenol ===
Phenol exhibit a strong molecular ion peak. Loss of H· is observed (M – 1), CO (M – 28) and formyl radical (HCO·, M – 29) is common observed.

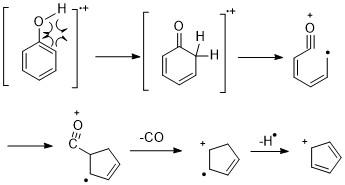
Possible fragmentation mechanism of phenols

=== Ether ===
Ethers produce slightly more intense molecular ion peaks compared to the corresponding alcohols or alkanes. There are two common cleavage modes. α-cleavage and C-O bond cleavage.

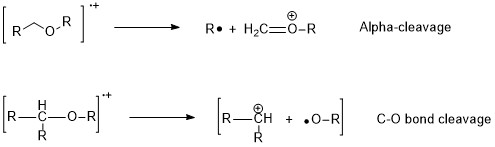
Fragmentation modes of aliphatic ethers

Aromatic ethers can generate the C6H5O+ ion by loss of the alkyl group rather than H; this can expel CO as in the phenolic degradation.

Fragmentation mechanism of aromatic ethers

=== Carbonyl compounds ===
There are five types of carbonyl compounds, including aldehydes, ketones, carboxylic acids and esters. The principal fragmentation modes are described as follows:

Alpha-cleavage can occur on either side of the carbonyl functional group since an oxygen lone pair can stabilize the positive charge.

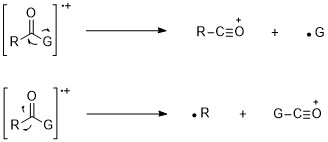
Alpha cleavage of carbonyl compounds

β-cleavage is a characteristic mode of carbonyl compounds' fragmentation due to the resonance stabilization.

Beta cleavage of carbonyl compounds

For longer chain carbonyl compounds (carbon number is bigger than 4), McLafferty rearrangements are dominant.

McLafferty rearrangement of carbonyl compounds

According to these fragmentation patterns, the characteristic peaks of carbonyl compounds are summarized in the following table.

| Fragmentation | Path | m/z of ion observed | | | | |
| Fragmentation | Path | Aldehydes G = H | Ketones G=CH_{3} | Esters G=OCH_{3} | Acids G = OH | Amides G = NH2 |
|---|---|---|---|---|---|---|
| Alpha-cleavage | Loss of R radical | 29 | 43 | 59 | 45 | 44 |
| Alpha-cleavage | Loss of G radical | M-1 | M-15 | M-59 | M-45 | M-44 |
| Beta-cleavage | | M-43 | M-57 | M-73 | M-59 | M-58 |
| McLafferty rearrangement | | 44 | 58 | 74 | 60 | 59 |

For aromatic carbonyl compounds, Alpha-cleavages are favorable primarily to lose G· (M – 1,15, 29…) to form the C6H5CO+ ion (m/z=105), which can further lose CO (m/z= 77) and HCCH (m/z=51).

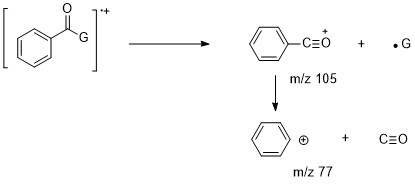
Aromatic carbonyl compound fragmentation mechanism

=== Amines ===
Amines follow nitrogen rule. Odd molecular ion mass-to-charge ratio suggests existence of odd numbers of nitrogens. Nonetheless, molecular ion peaks are weak in aliphatic amines due to the ease of fragmentation next to amines. Alpha-cleavage reactions are the most important fragmentation mode for amines; for 1° n-aliphatic amines, there is an intense peak at m/z 30.

Alpha cleavage of amines

Aromatic amines have intense molecular ion peaks. For anilines, they prefer to lose a hydrogen atom before the expulsion of HCN.

Aniline fragmentation mechanism

=== Nitriles ===
The principle fragmentation mode is the loss of an H-atom (M – 1) from the carbon next to the CN group due to the resonance stabilization. McLafferty rearrangement can be observed when they have longer chain lengths.

Nitrile fragmentation

=== Nitro compounds ===
The aliphatic nitro compounds normally show weak molecular ion peaks, while the aromatic nitro compounds give a strong peak. Common degradation mode is loss of NO^{+} and NO^{2+}.

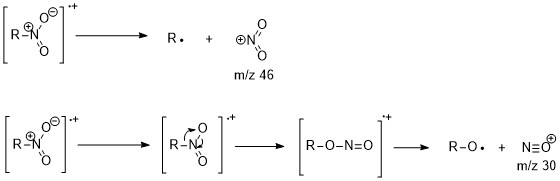
Nitro compound fragmentation

== Electrospray and atmospheric pressure chemical ionization ==
Electrospray and atmospheric pressure chemical ionization have different rules for spectrum interpretation due to the different ionization mechanisms. Fragmentation behavior is different too.

== Software ==
Modern mass spectra are usually analyzed using software: computers can search through libraries of known mass spectra peaks much faster than humans could. For peaks not found in the library, computers can simulate ionization and fragmentation processes (as well as isotope combinations) to generate hypothetical peaks to match against. Many databases of experimental peaks as well as pre-calculated hypothetical peaks are available; these can be combined in looking for a suitable interpretation of a peak.

== See also ==
- Component Detection Algorithm (CODA), an algorithm used in mass spectrometry data analysis
- List of mass spectrometry software
