= Melvin Barnett Comisarow =

Canadian physicist and analytical chemist

- Education: University of Alberta (B.S., 1963); Case Western Reserve University (Ph.D., 1959)
- Known for: Fourier-transform ion cyclotron resonance Mass spectroscopy
- Awards: Fellowship of the Royal Society of Canada (1995)
- Scientific career
- Fields: Chemistry
- Workplaces: University of British Columbia
- Thesis: Studies of stable long lived carbonium ions (1969)
- Doctoral advisor: George Andrew Olah
- Website: www.cce.caltech.edu/content/john-d-baldeschwieler

Melvin Barnett Comisarow FRSC is a Canadian physicist and analytical chemist who co-invented the Fourier-transform ion cyclotron resonance technique of mass spectroscopy, together with Alan G. Marshall, at the University of British Columbia. Comisarow was born in Alberta to a Ukrainian-Canadian family, and earned his bachelor's degree at the University of Alberta, 1963, before obtaining his PhD at Case Western Reserve University, under the supervision of George Andrew Olah in 1969, and subsequently a postdoc with John D. Baldeschwieler at Stanford University. His first academic appointment was at the University of British Columbia, where he subsequently stayed until retirement.

He is a fellow of the American Chemical Society, and the Royal Society of Canada, and has received numerous awards, including the Barringer Award of the Spectroscopy Society of Canada (1989); 1995 Field Franklin Award for Mass Spectroscopy, from the American Chemical Society; and the 1996 Fisher Award in Analytical Chemistry of Canadian Society for Chemistry.

== See also ==
- Petroleomics
