= Monoisotopic =

- Monoisotopic mass is the sum of the masses of the atoms in a molecule using the most abundant isotope for each element
- Monoisotopic element is one of the 26 chemical elements which have only one stable isotope
