= Kendrick mass =

The Kendrick mass is defined by setting the mass of a chosen molecular fragment, typically CH_{2}, to an integer value in Da (dalton). It is different from the IUPAC definition, which is based on setting the mass of ^{12}C isotope to exactly 12 u. The Kendrick mass is often used to identify homologous compounds differing only by a number of base units in high resolution mass spectra. This definition of mass was first suggested in 1963 by chemist Edward Kendrick, and it has been adopted by scientists working in the area of high-resolution mass spectrometry, environmental analysis, proteomics, petroleomics, metabolomics, polymer analysis, etc.

== Definition ==
According to the procedure outlined by Kendrick, the mass of CH_{2} is defined as exactly 14 Da, instead of the IUPAC mass of 14.01565 Da.

To convert an IUPAC mass of a particular compound to the Kendrick mass, the equation

$$\text{Kendrick mass} = \text{IUPAC mass} \times \frac{14.00000}{14.01565}$$

is used. The mass in dalton units (Da) can be converted to the Kendrick scale by dividing by 1.0011178.

Other groups of atoms in addition to CH_{2} can be used define the Kendrick mass, for example CO_{2}, H_{2}, H_{2}O, and O. In this case, the Kendrick mass for a family of compounds F is given by

$$\text{Kendrick mass (F)} = \text{(observed mass)} \times \frac{\text{nominal mass (F)}}{\text{exact mass (F)}}$$.

For the hydrocarbon analysis, F=CH_{2}.

As an example, Kendrick analysis has been used for visualizing families of halogenated compounds of environmental interest that differ only by the number of chlorine, bromine or fluorine substitutions.

It has been suggested that Kendrick mass be expressed in Kendrick units with symbol Ke.

== Kendrick mass defect ==
The Kendrick mass defect is defined as the exact Kendrick mass subtracted from the nominal (integer) Kendrick mass:

$$\text{Kendrick mass defect}= \text{nominal Kendrick mass} - \text{Kendrick mass}$$

In recent years the equation has changed due to rounding errors to:

$$\text{Kendrick mass defect}= \text{nominal mass} - \text{Kendrick exact mass}$$

The members of an alkylation series have the same degree of unsaturation and number of heteroatoms (nitrogen, oxygen and sulfur) but differ in the number of CH_{2} units. Members of an alkylation series have the same Kendrick mass defect.

The Kendrick mass defect has also been defined as

$\text{Kendrick mass defect}= (\text{nominal Kendrick mass} - \text{Kendrick mass}) \times 1{,}000$ .

The abbreviations KM and KMD have been used for Kendrick mass and Kendrick mass defect, respectively.

== Kendrick mass analysis ==
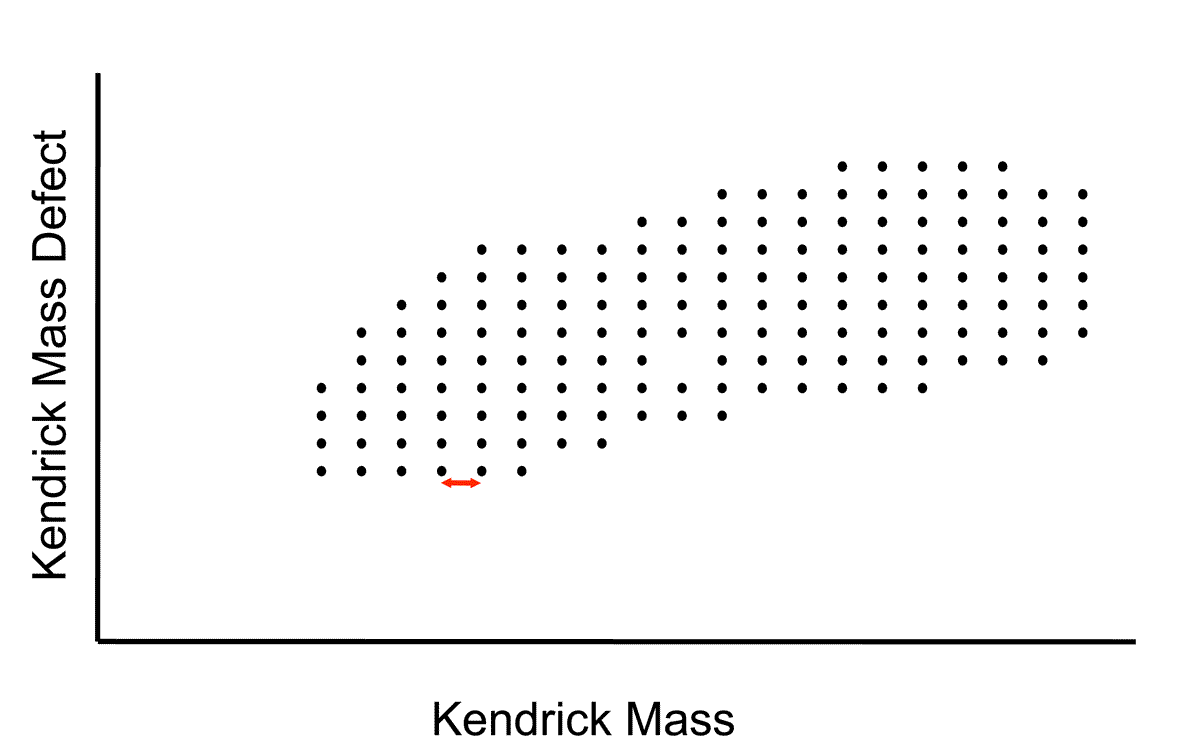
Plot of Kendrick mass defect as function of Kendrick mass; horizontal lines indicate common repeat units. Each dot in the plot corresponds to a peak measured in a mass spectrum.

In a Kendrick mass analysis, the Kendrick mass defect is plotted as function of nominal Kendrick mass for ions observed in a mass spectrum. Ions of the same family, for example the members of an alkylation series, have the same Kendrick mass defect but different nominal Kendrick mass and are positioned along a horizontal line on the plot. If the composition of one ion in the family can be determined, the composition of the other ions can be inferred. Horizontal lines of different Kendrick mass defect correspond to ions of different composition, for example degree of saturation or heteroatom content.

A Kendrick mass analysis is often used in conjunction with a Van Krevelen diagram, a two- or three- dimensional graphical analysis in which the elemental composition of the compounds are plotted according to the atomic ratios H/C, O/C, or N/C.

=== Kendrick mass defect analysis of polymers and alternative base units ===
Because Kendrick mass defect analysis can be carried out by substituting any repeating unit for CH_{2}, KMD analysis is particularly useful for the visualizing the data from polymer mass spectra. For example, a Kendrick mass defect plot of an ethylene oxide/propylene oxide copolymer can be created by using ethylene oxide (C_{2}H_{4}O) as the base unit and calculating the Kendrick mass as:

$$\text{Kendrick mass} = \text{IUPAC mass} \times \frac{44.00000}{44.02621}$$

where 44.02621 is the calculated IUPAC mass for C_{2}H_{4}O. Alternatively, a KMD plot can be constructed for the same copolymer by using propylene oxide as the base unit.

Polymer mass spectra containing multiple charge ions exhibit isotopic splitting.

=== Fractional base units and referenced KMD plots ===
Kendrick mass defect plots created by using fractional base units exhibit enhanced resolution. Referenced Kendrick mass defect plots (KMD plots referenced to the terminal group and adduct composition) with fractional base units can be used to obtain an overview of copolymer composition.

== See also ==
- Petroleomics
