= Aleksandr Makarov (physicist) =

Russian physicist (born 1966)

Alexander Alexeyevich Makarov FRS
- Born: 1966 (age 59–60); Irkutsk, Russian SFSR, Soviet Union
- Education: M.S. 1989 Moscow Engineering Physics Institute; Ph.D. 1993 Moscow Engineering Physics Institute
- Known for: Mass Spectrometry, Orbitrap
- Awards: Distinguished Contribution in Mass Spectrometry Award
- Scientific career
- Fields: Physicist
- Workplaces: Thermo Fisher Scientific

Alexander Alexeyevich Makarov, FRS (Russian: Александр Алексеевич Макаров; born 1966) is a Russian physicist who led the team that developed the Orbitrap, a type of mass spectrometer, and received the 2008 American Society for Mass Spectrometry Distinguished Contribution in Mass Spectrometry Award for this development. In November 2013 he was appointed to Professor by Special Appointment of High Resolution Mass Spectrometry at the Department of Chemistry and the Bijvoet Center for Biomolecular Research of Utrecht University in the Netherlands.

As of 2016, he is Director of Global Research for Life Sciences Mass Spectrometry at Thermo Fisher Scientific.

== Early life and education ==
- 1989 Moscow Engineering Physics Institute - M.S. Molecular Physics
- 1993 Moscow Engineering Physics Institute - Ph.D. Physics and Mathematics
- 1994-1996 Warwick University - Postdoctoral Appointment

== Awards ==
- 2008 ASMS Distinguished Contribution in Mass Spectrometry Award
- 2012 Thomson Medal Award
- 2020 Fellow of the Royal Society
