= Mass (mass spectrometry) =

Physical quantities being measured

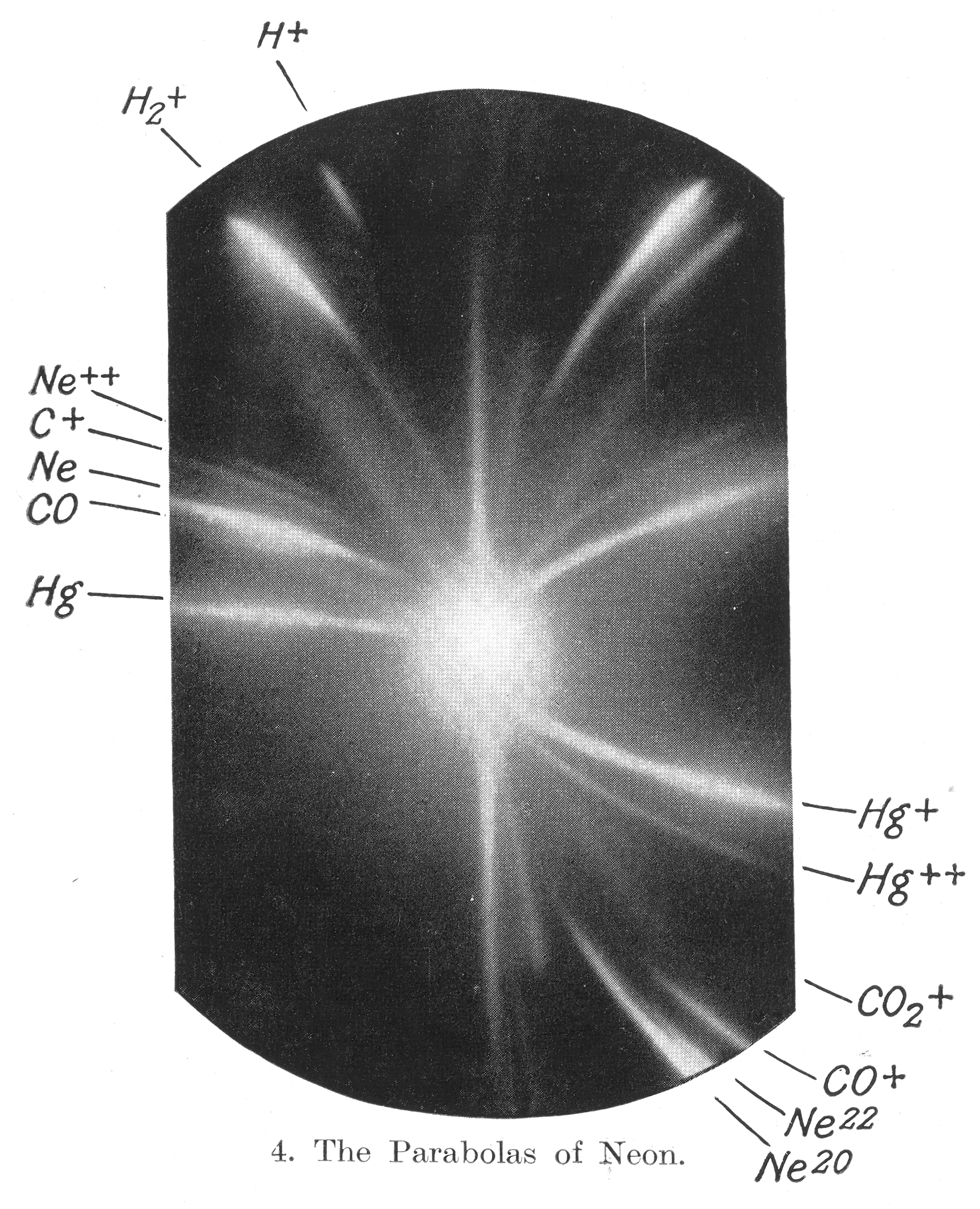
J. J. Thomson discovered the isotopes of neon using mass spectrometry.

The mass recorded by a mass spectrometer can refer to different physical quantities depending on the characteristics of the instrument and the manner in which the mass spectrum is displayed.

== Units ==
The dalton (symbol: Da) is the standard unit that is used for indicating mass on an atomic or molecular scale (atomic mass). The unified atomic mass unit (symbol: u) is equivalent to the dalton. One dalton is one-twelfth of the mass of one atom of carbon-12, and is 1.66053906892(52)×10^{−27} kg. The amu without the "unified" prefix is an obsolete unit based on oxygen, which was replaced in 1961.

== Relative molecular mass ==
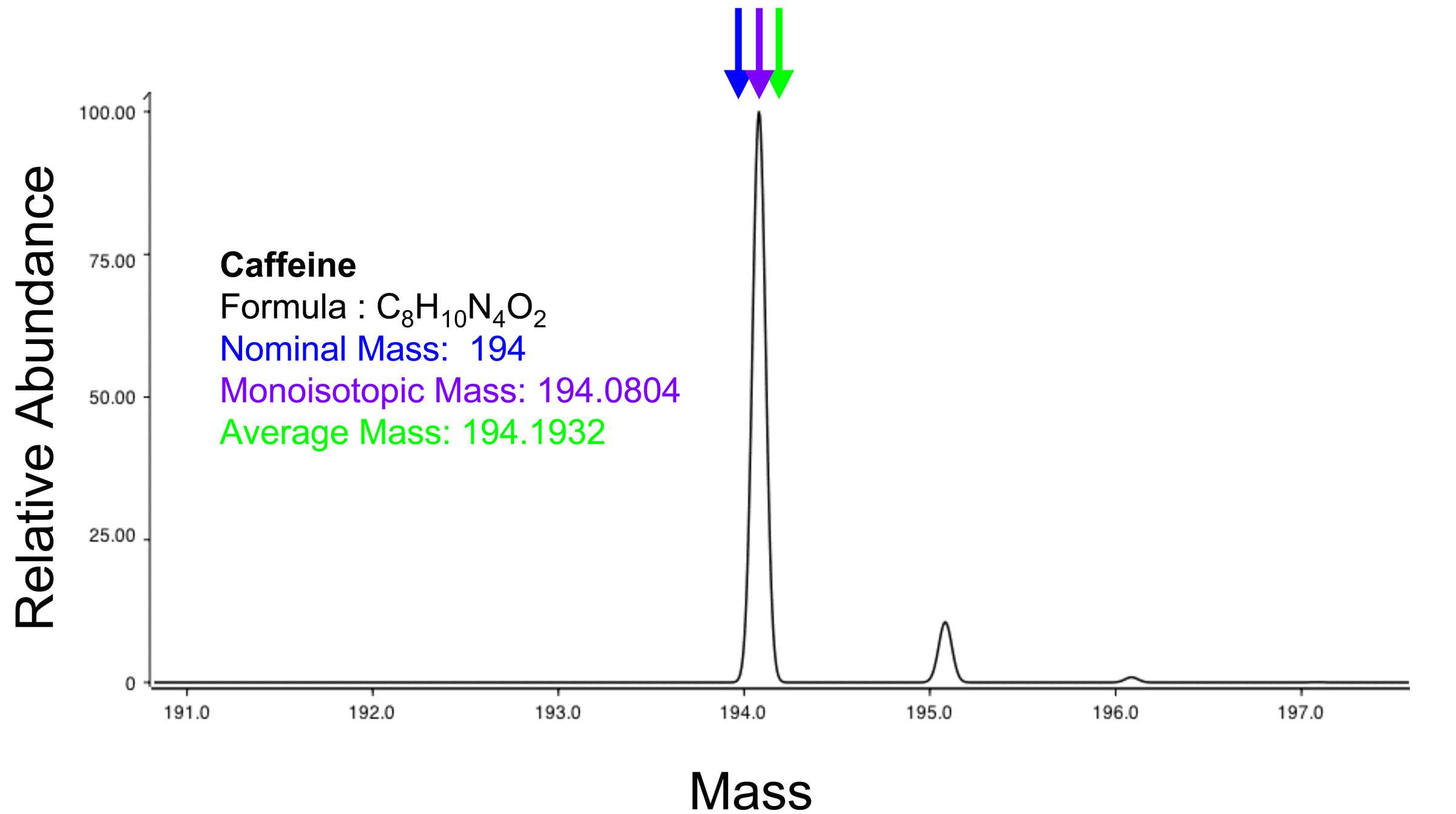
Theoretical isotope distribution for the molecular ion of caffeine

The relative molecular mass (denoted M_{r}) of a substance, formerly also called molecular weight and abbreviated as MW, is the mass of one molecule of that substance, relative to the dalton (Da), which is equal to 1/12 the mass of one atom of ^{12}C. Due to this relativity, the molecular mass of a substance is commonly referred to as the relative molecular mass, and denoted to M_{r}.

== Average mass ==
The average mass of a molecule is obtained by summing the average atomic masses of the constituent elements. For example, the average mass of natural water with formula H_{2}O is 1.00794 + 1.00794 + 15.9994 = 18.01528 Da.

== Mass number ==
The mass number, also called the nucleon number, is the number of protons and neutrons in an atomic nucleus. The mass number is unique for each isotope of an element and is written either after the element name or as a superscript to the left of an element's symbol. For example, carbon-12 (^{12}C) has 6 protons and 6 neutrons.

=== Nominal mass ===
The nominal mass for an element is the mass number of its most abundant naturally occurring stable isotope, and for an ion or molecule, the nominal mass is the sum of the nominal masses of the constituent atoms. Isotope abundances are tabulated by IUPAC: for example carbon has two stable isotopes ^{12}C at 98.9% natural abundance and ^{13}C at 1.1% natural abundance, thus the nominal mass of carbon is 12. The nominal mass is not always the lowest mass number, for example iron has isotopes ^{54}Fe, ^{56}Fe, ^{57}Fe, and ^{58}Fe with abundances 6%, 92%, 2%, and 0.3%, respectively, and a nominal mass of 56 Da. For a molecule, the nominal mass is obtained by summing the nominal masses of the constituent elements, for example water has two hydrogen atoms with nominal mass 1 Da and one oxygen atom with nominal mass 16 Da, therefore the nominal mass of H_{2}O is 18 Da.

In mass spectrometry, the difference between the nominal mass and the monoisotopic mass is the mass defect (see § mass defect. This differs from the definition of mass defect used in physics which is the difference between the mass of a composite particle and the sum of the masses of its constituent parts.

== Accurate mass ==
The accurate mass (more appropriately, the measured accurate mass) is an experimentally determined mass that allows the elemental composition to be determined. For molecules with mass below 200 Da, 5 ppm accuracy is often sufficient to uniquely determine the elemental composition.

== Exact mass ==
The exact mass of an isotopic species (more appropriately, the calculated exact mass) is obtained by summing the masses of the individual isotopes of the molecule. For example, the exact mass of water containing two hydrogen-1 (^{1}H) and one oxygen-16 (^{16}O) is 1.0078 + 1.0078 + 15.9949 = 18.0105 Da. The exact mass of heavy water, containing two hydrogen-2 (deuterium or ^{2}H) and one oxygen-16 (^{16}O) is 2.0141 + 2.0141 + 15.9949 = 20.0229 Da.

When an exact mass value is given without specifying an isotopic species, it normally refers to the most abundant isotopic species (monoisotopic mass).

=== Monoisotopic mass ===
The monoisotopic mass is the sum of the masses of the atoms in a molecule using the unbound, ground-state, rest mass of the principal (most abundant) isotope for each element. The monoisotopic mass of a molecule or ion is the exact mass obtained using the principal isotopes. Monoisotopic mass is typically expressed in daltons (Da). This is also known as the exact (a.k.a theoretical) mass.

For typical organic compounds, where the monoisotopic mass is most commonly used, this also results in the lightest isotope being selected. For some heavier atoms such as iron and argon the principal isotope is not the lightest isotope. The mass spectrum peak corresponding to the monoisotopic mass is often not observed for large molecules, but can be determined from the isotopic distribution.

=== Most abundant mass ===
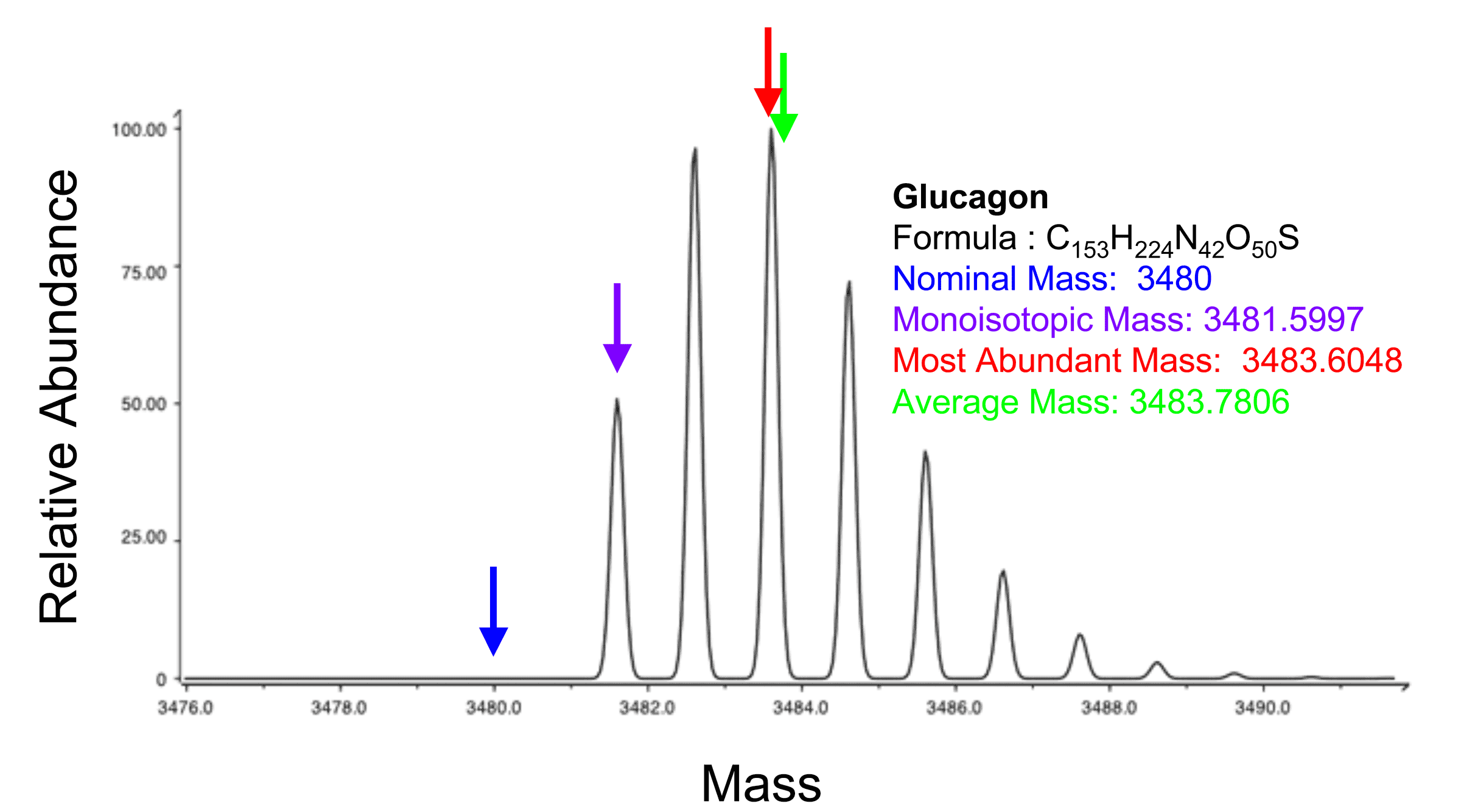
Theoretical isotope distribution for the molecular ion of glucagon (C_{153}H_{224}N_{42}O_{50}S)

The most abundant mass is the location of the most abundant peak of an isotopometric cluster, as observed by mass spectrometry. Because it is an observed value, it is affected by the resolution of the spectrometer being used. This value can be theoretically calculated by first obtaining a list of exact peaks using the natural abundances of the isotopes, then applying a blurring/smearing operation to simulate the resolution of the actual instrument. This is also called "isotope cluster prediction". Because isotopes differ in mass from each other by a nearly integer amount of Da, the peaks also tend to occur in spacings of 1 Da: this leads to the observed clustering.

The most abundant mass tends to be different from the monoisotopic mass for larger molecules: the more atoms there are, the higher the chances that there is at least one atom that is not the most abundant isotope (see the negative binomial distribution). As a result it is important in the identification of larger molecules. There are pre-calculated tables (derived from a binomial distribution) that allow for efficient hand-calculation of the most abundant mass to an integer precision.

== Isotopomer and isotopologue ==
Isotopomers (isotopic isomers) are isomers having the same number of each isotopic atom, but differing in the positions of the isotopic atoms. For example, CH_{3}CHDCH_{3} and CH_{3}CH_{2}CH_{2}D are a pair of structural isotopomers.

Isotopomers should not be confused with isotopologues, which are chemical species that differ in the isotopic composition of their molecules or ions. For example, three isotopologues of the water molecule with different isotopic composition of hydrogen are: HOH, HOD and DOD, where D stands for deuterium (^{2}H).

== Kendrick mass ==
The Kendrick mass is a mass obtained by multiplying the measured mass by a numeric factor. The Kendrick mass is used to aid in the identification of molecules of similar chemical structure from peaks in mass spectra. The method of stating mass was suggested in 1963 by the chemist Edward Kendrick.

According to the procedure outlined by Kendrick, the mass of CH_{2} is defined as 14.000 Da, instead of 14.01565 Da.

The Kendrick mass for a family of compounds $F$ is given by

$$\mbox{Kendrick mass}~(F) = (\mbox{observed mass}) \times \frac{\mbox{nominal mass}~(F)}{\mbox{exact mass}~(F)}.$$

For hydrocarbon analysis, $F$ = CH_{2}.

== Mass defect ==
The mass defect used in nuclear physics is different from its use in mass spectrometry. In nuclear physics, the mass defect is the difference in the mass of a composite particle and the sum of the masses of its component parts. In mass spectrometry the mass defect is defined as the difference between the exact mass and the nearest integer mass.

The Kendrick mass defect is the exact Kendrick mass subtracted from the nearest integer Kendrick mass.

Mass defect filtering can be used to selectively detect compounds with a mass spectrometer based on their chemical composition.

=== Packing fraction ===
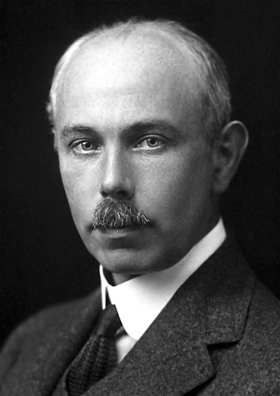
Francis William Aston won the 1922 Nobel Prize in Chemistry for his discovery, by means of his mass spectrograph, of isotopes, in a large number of non-radioactive elements, and for his enunciation of the whole number rule.

The term packing fraction was defined by Aston as the difference of the measured mass M and the nearest integer mass I (then based on the oxygen-16 mass scale) divided by the quantity comprising the mass number multiplied by ten thousand:

$$f=\frac{M-I}{10^4\ I}$$.

Aston's early model of nuclear structure (prior to the discovery of the neutron) postulated that the electromagnetic fields of closely packed protons and electrons in the nucleus would interfere and a fraction of the mass would be destroyed. A low packing fraction is indicative of a stable nucleus.

=== Prout's hypothesis and the whole number rule ===
The whole number rule states that the masses of the isotopes are integer multiples of the mass of the hydrogen atom. The rule is a modified version of Prout's hypothesis proposed in 1815, to the effect that atomic weights are multiples of the weight of the hydrogen atom.

== Nitrogen rule ==
The nitrogen rule states that organic compounds containing exclusively hydrogen, carbon, nitrogen, oxygen, silicon, phosphorus, sulfur, and the halogens either have an odd nominal mass that indicates an odd number of nitrogen atoms are present or an even nominal mass that indicates an even number of nitrogen atoms are present in the molecular ion.

== See also ==
- List of elements by atomic mass
