= Ion-neutral complex =

An ion-neutral complex in chemistry is an aggregate of an ion with one or more neutral molecules in which at least one of the partners has a rotational degree of freedom about an axis perpendicular to the intermolecular direction. In chemistry, the dissociation of a molecule into two or more fragments can take place in the gas phase, provided there is sufficient internal energy for the requisite barriers to be overcome.

For many years, it was assumed that the fragments of a gas phase dissociation simply fly apart. In 1958, Allan Maccoll suggested that the decomposition of alkyl halides (RX) might take place via the intermediacy of ion pairs, [R^{+} X^{−}], in which the charged fragments were no longer covalently bonded but were held together by electrostatic attraction. Maccoll and coworkers subsequently examined chlorine isotope effects in the thermal decomposition of chloroethane and concluded that the data did not support that interpretation; however, he had provided the germ of an idea that came to fruition two decades later in the study of decompositions of electrically charged molecules.

In the late 1970s three research groups—in England, the United States, and France—independently provided evidence for the occurrence of ion-neutral complexes (sometimes called ion-dipole complexes or ion-molecule complexes) in the unimolecular dissociations of positive ions under the conditions associated with mass spectrometry (i.e. as isolated species in a vacuum). The general idea is that a charged species, RY^{+}, can give rise to dissociation fragments via a transient complex, [R^{+} Y], in which the electrically charged partner, R^{+}, can undergo molecular rearrangements at the same time as it rotates relative to the neutral partner, Y. Similarly, the neutral partner, Y, can also rotate relative to the charged partner, as well as having the ability to exchange Hydrogens and internal energy with it.

More recently several research groups have provided evidence that revives Maccoll's original hypothesis, but with the variation that the fragments that sojourn in the presence of one another are both electrically uncharged. In other words, dissociations of a neutral molecule RX can take place in the gas phase via the intermediacy of radical pairs [R· X·], where X· can be as small as a hydrogen atom. In the gas phase such intermediates are often called roaming radicals.
