= Dalton (unit) =

Standard unit of mass for atomic-scale entities

dalton (unified atomic mass unit)
- Unit of: mass
- Symbol: Da, u
- Named after: John Dalton
- Equal to: 1.66053906892(52)×10^{−27} kg; 1 m_{u}; 931.49410372(29) MeV/c^{2}

The dalton (symbol: Da), or unified atomic mass unit (symbol: u), is a unit of mass defined as 1/12 of the mass of an unbound neutral atom of carbon-12 in its nuclear and electronic ground state and at rest. The word "unified" emphasizes that the definition was jointly accepted by physics (IUPAP) and chemistry (IUPAC) organizations. The atomic mass constant, denoted m_{u}, is an atomic-scale reference mass, defined identically, but it is not a unit of mass. Expressed in terms of m_{a}(^{12}C), the atomic mass of carbon-12: m_{u} = m_{a}(^{12}C)/12 = 1 Da. A proton has a mass that is approximately equal to 1 dalton.

The value serves as a conversion factor of mass from daltons to kilograms, which can easily be converted to grams and other metric units of mass. The 2019 revision of the SI redefined the kilogram by fixing the value of the Planck constant (h), improving the precision of the atomic mass constant expressed in SI units by anchoring it to fixed physical constants. Although the dalton remains defined via carbon-12, the revision enhances traceability and accuracy in atomic mass measurements.

The dalton's numerical value in terms of the fixed-h kilogram is an experimentally determined quantity that, along with its inherent uncertainty, is updated periodically. The 2022 CODATA recommended value of the atomic mass constant expressed in the SI base unit kilogram is:

m_{u} = 1.66053906892(52)×10^{−27} kg.

The previous 2018 CODATA value was used in the traditional definition of the Avogadro number to obtain the value g/Da = 6.0221407620(18)×10^{23}, which was then rounded to 9 significant figures (thus guaranteeing continuity, to the precision indicated) and used to define it at exactly that value for the 2019 redefinition of the mole.

The mole is a unit of amount of substance used in chemistry and physics, such that the mass of one mole of a substance expressed in grams (i.e., the molar mass in g/mol or kg/kmol) is numerically equal to the average mass of an elementary entity of the substance (atom, molecule, or formula unit) expressed in daltons. For example, the average mass of one molecule of water is about 18.0153 Da, and the mass of one mole of water is about 18.0153 g. A protein whose molecule has an average mass of 64 kDa would have a molar mass of 64 kg/mol. However, while this equality can be assumed for practical purposes, it is only approximate, because of the 2019 redefinition of the mole.

== Usage ==
The dalton is commonly used in physics and chemistry to express the mass of atomic-scale objects, such as atoms, molecules, and elementary particles, both for discrete instances and multiple types of ensemble averages. For example, an atom of helium-4 has a mass of 4.0026 Da. This is an intrinsic property of the isotope and all helium-4 atoms have the same mass. Acetylsalicylic acid (aspirin), C_{9}H_{8}O_{4}, has an average mass of about 180.157 Da. However, there are no acetylsalicylic acid molecules with this mass. The two most common masses of individual acetylsalicylic acid molecules are 180.0423 Da, having the most common isotopes, and 181.0456 Da, in which one carbon is carbon-13.

The molecular masses of proteins, nucleic acids, and other large polymers are often expressed with the unit kilodalton (kDa) and megadalton (MDa). Titin, one of the largest known proteins, has a molecular mass of between 3 and 3.7 megadaltons. The DNA of chromosome 1 in the human genome has about 249 million base pairs, each with an average mass of about 650 Da, or 156 gigadalton (GDa) total.

In general, the mass in daltons of an atom is numerically close but not exactly equal to the number of nucleons (protons and neutrons) in its nucleus. It follows that the molar mass of a compound (grams per mole) is numerically close to the average number of nucleons contained in each molecule. By definition, the mass of an atom of carbon-12 is 12 daltons, which corresponds with the number of nucleons that it has (6 protons and 6 neutrons). However, the mass of an atomic-scale object is affected by the binding energy of the nucleons in its atomic nuclei, as well as the mass and binding energy of its electrons. Therefore, this equality holds only for the carbon-12 atom in the stated conditions, and will vary for other substances. For example, the mass of an unbound atom of the common hydrogen isotope (hydrogen-1, protium) is 1.007825032241(94) Da, (Note: The digits in parentheses indicate the uncertainty; see Uncertainty notation.) the mass of a proton is 1.0072764665789(83) Da, the mass of a free neutron is 1.00866491606(40) Da, and the mass of a hydrogen-2 (deuterium) atom is 2.014101778114(122) Da. In general, the difference (absolute mass excess) is less than 0.1%; exceptions include hydrogen-1 (about 0.8%), helium-3 (0.5%), lithium-6 (0.25%) and beryllium (0.14%).

The dalton differs from the unit of mass in the system of atomic units, which is the electron rest mass (m_{e}).

== Energy equivalents ==
The atomic mass constant can also be expressed as its energy-equivalent, m_{u}c^{2}. The CODATA recommended values are:

m_{u}c^{2} = 1.49241808768(46)×10^{−10} J = 931.49410372(29) MeV.

The mass-equivalent is commonly used in place of a unit of mass in particle physics, and these values are also important for the practical determination of relative atomic masses.

== History ==
=== Origin of the concept ===
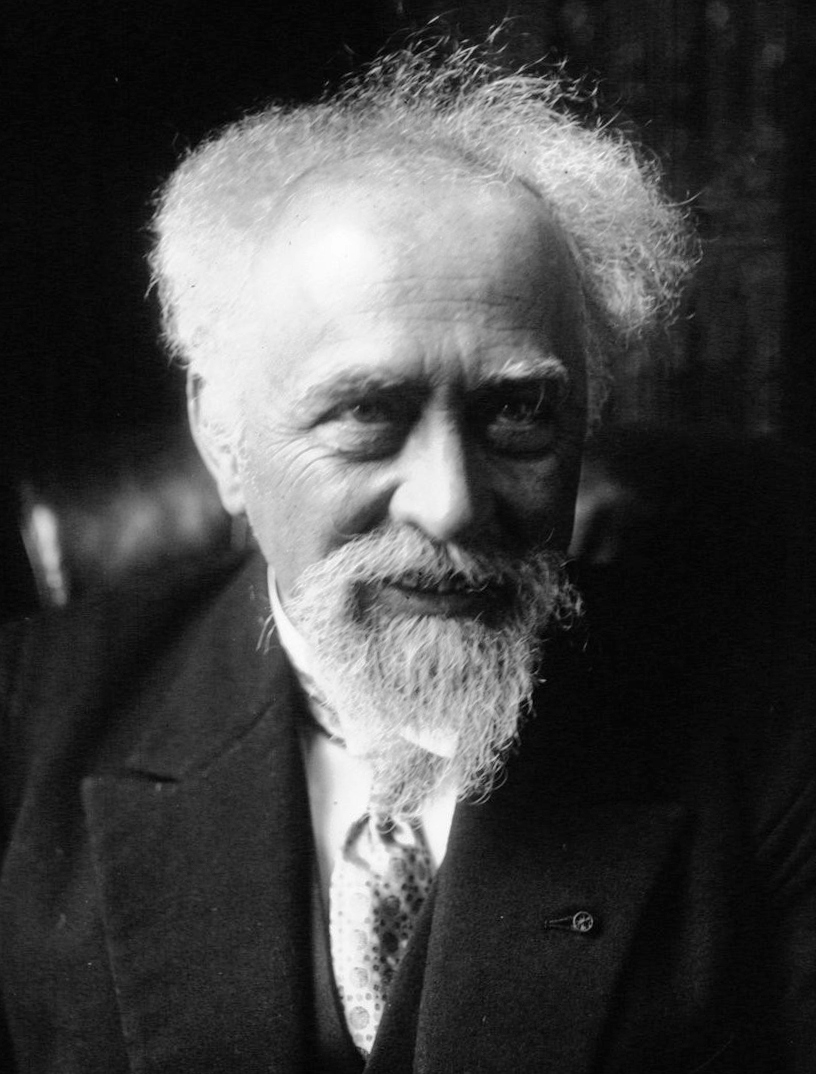
Jean Perrin in 1926

The interpretation of the law of definite proportions in terms of the atomic theory of matter implied that the masses of atoms of various elements had definite ratios that depended on the elements. While the actual masses were unknown, the relative masses could be deduced from that law. In 1803 John Dalton proposed to use the (still unknown) atomic mass of the lightest atom, hydrogen, as the natural unit of atomic mass. This was the basis of the atomic weight scale.

For technical reasons, in 1898, chemist Wilhelm Ostwald and others proposed to redefine the unit of atomic mass as 1/16 the mass of an oxygen atom. That proposal was formally adopted by the International Committee on Atomic Weights (ICAW) in 1903. That was approximately the mass of one hydrogen atom, but oxygen was more amenable to experimental determination. This suggestion was made before the discovery of isotopes in 1912. Physicist Jean Perrin had adopted the same definition in 1909 during his experiments to determine the atomic masses and the Avogadro constant. This definition remained unchanged until 1961. Perrin also defined the "mole" as an amount of a compound that contained as many molecules as 32 grams of oxygen (O_{2}). He called that number the Avogadro number in honor of physicist Amedeo Avogadro.

=== Isotopic variation ===
The discovery of isotopes of oxygen in 1929 required a more precise definition of the unit. Two distinct definitions came into use. Chemists choose to define the AMU as 1/16 of the average mass of an oxygen atom as found in nature; that is, the average of the masses of the known isotopes, weighted by their natural abundance. Physicists, on the other hand, defined it as 1/16 of the mass of an atom of the isotope oxygen-16 (^{16}O).

=== Joint definition by IUPAP and IUPAC ===
The existence of two distinct units with the same name was confusing, and the difference (about 1.000282 in relative terms) was large enough to affect high-precision measurements. Moreover, it was discovered that the isotopes of oxygen had different natural abundances in water and in air.

In April 1957 Alfred O. C. Nier suggested to Josef Mattauch that carbon-12 be adopted as the mass scale because of carbon's use as a secondary standard in mass spectrometry. Also, carbon-12 implied acceptable relative changes in the atomic weight scale, i.e., 42 parts-per-million (ppm) compared to 275 ppm for oxygen-16, which would not be acceptable to chemists.

Following the approval of the International Union of Pure and Applied Physics (IUPAP) General Assembly at Ottawa, Canada, in 1960 and the International Union of Pure and Applied Chemistry (IUPAC) General Assembly at Montreal, Canada, in 1961, the atomic weights were officially given on the carbon-12 scale for the first time.

The new unit was named the "unified atomic mass unit" and given a new symbol "u", to replace the old "amu" that had been used for the oxygen-based unit. However, the old symbol "amu" has sometimes been used after 1961 to refer to the new unit, particularly in lay and preparatory contexts.

With this new definition, the standard atomic weight of carbon is about 12.011 Da and that of oxygen is about 15.999 Da. These values, generally used in chemistry, are based on averages of many samples from Earth's crust, its atmosphere, and organic materials.

=== Adoption by BIPM until 2026 ===
The IUPAC 1961 definition of the unified atomic mass unit, with that name and symbol "u", was adopted by the International Bureau for Weights and Measures (BIPM) in 1971 as a non-SI unit accepted for use with the SI. From 2026, the BIPM no longer describes it, or other units, as accepted for use with SI; it is listed among a group of "Internationally recognised units that are not decimal multiples or submultiples of SI units".

=== Unit name ===
In 1993, the IUPAC proposed the shorter name "dalton" (with symbol "Da") for the unified atomic mass unit. As with other unit names such as watt and newton, "dalton" is not capitalized in English, but its symbol, "Da", is capitalized. The name was endorsed by the International Union of Pure and Applied Physics (IUPAP) in 2005.

In 2003 the name was recommended to the BIPM by the Consultative Committee for Units, part of the CIPM, as it "is shorter and works better with [SI] prefixes". In 2006, the BIPM included the dalton in its 8th edition of the SI brochure of formal definitions as a non-SI unit accepted for use with the SI. The name was also listed as an alternative to "unified atomic mass unit" by the International Organization for Standardization in 2009. It is now recommended by several scientific publishers, and some of them consider "atomic mass unit" and "amu" deprecated. In 2019, the BIPM retained the dalton in its 9th edition of the SI brochure, while dropping the unified atomic mass unit from its table of non-SI units accepted for use with the SI, but secondarily notes that the dalton (Da) and the unified atomic mass unit (u) are alternative names (and symbols) for the same unit.

=== 2019 revision of the SI ===
The definition of the dalton was not affected by the 2019 revision of the SI, that is, 1 Da in the SI is still 1/12 of the mass of a carbon-12 atom, a quantity that must be determined experimentally in terms of SI units. However, the definition of a mole was changed to be the amount of substance consisting of exactly 6.02214076×10^{23} entities, and the definition of the kilogram was changed as well. As a consequence, the molar mass constant (M_{u}) remains close to but no longer exactly 1 g/mol, meaning that the mass in grams of one mole of any substance remains nearly but no longer exactly numerically equal to the average mass of an entity in daltons, although the relative standard uncertainty of 4.5×10^{−10} at the time of the redefinition is insignificant for all practical purposes. Letting ent denote one entity, the smallest amount of any substance (retaining its chemical properties), one mole is an aggregate of an Avogadro number of entities, i.e. 1 mol = N_{0} ent ≈ (g/Da) ent. This means that the appropriate atomic-scale unit for molar mass is dalton per entity (Da/ent), equal to the constant M_{u}, very nearly equal to 1 g/mol. For Da/ent to be exactly equal to g/mol, the dalton would need to be redefined exactly in terms of the (fixed-h) kilogram and the Avogadro number so that 1 Da = (1/N_{0}) g, satisfying the relationships N_{0} = g/Da and 1 mol = N_{0} ent = (g/Da) ent, thus conforming to the original mole concept—that the Avogadro number is the gram-to-dalton mass unit ratio.

== Measurement ==
Though relative atomic masses are defined for neutral atoms, they are measured (by mass spectrometry) for ions: hence, the measured values must be corrected for the mass of the electrons that were removed to form the ions, and also for the mass equivalent of the electron binding energy, E_{b}/m_{u}c^{2}. The total binding energy of the six electrons in a carbon-12 atom is 1030.1089 eV = 1.6504163×10^{−16} J: E_{b}/m_{u}c^{2} = 1.1058674×10^{−6}, or about one part in 10 million of the mass of the atom.

Before the 2019 revision of the SI, experiments were aimed to determine the value of the Avogadro constant for finding the value of the unified atomic mass unit.

=== Josef Loschmidt ===
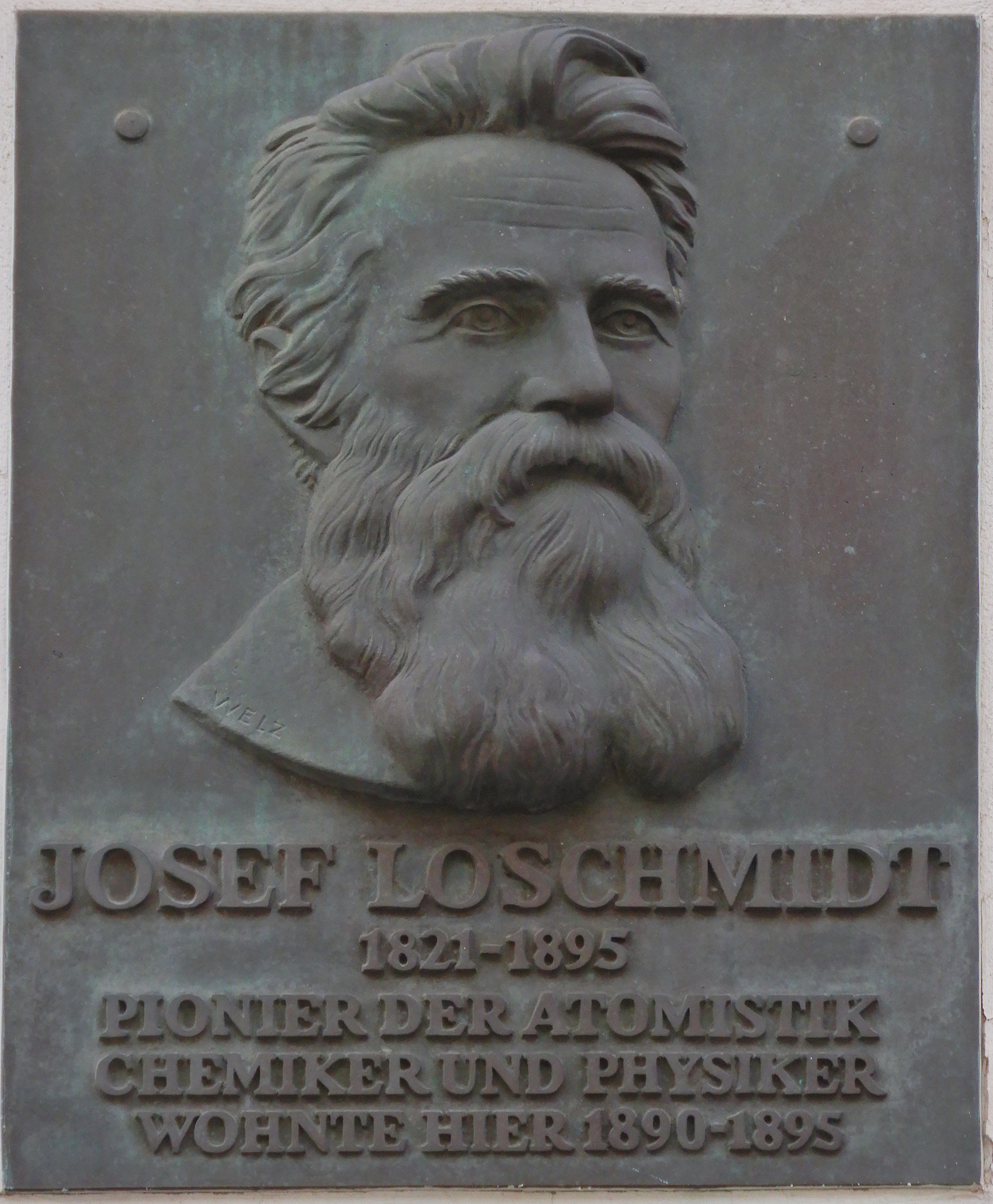
Josef Loschmidt

A reasonably accurate value of the atomic mass unit was first obtained indirectly by Josef Loschmidt in 1865, by estimating the number of particles in a given volume of gas.

=== Jean Perrin ===
Perrin estimated the Avogadro number by a variety of methods, at the turn of the 20th century. He was awarded the 1926 Nobel Prize in Physics, largely for this work.

=== Coulometry ===
The electric charge per mole of elementary charges is a constant called the Faraday constant, F, whose value had been essentially known since 1834 when Michael Faraday published his works on electrolysis. In 1910, Robert Millikan obtained the first measurement of the charge on an electron, −e. The quotient F/e provided an estimate of the Avogadro constant.

The classic experiment is that of Bower and Davis at NIST, and relies on dissolving silver metal away from the anode of an electrolysis cell, while passing a constant electric current I for a known time t. If m is the mass of silver lost from the anode and A_{r} the atomic weight of silver, then the Faraday constant is given by:
$$F = \frac{A_\text{r}M_\text{u}It}{m}.$$
The NIST scientists devised a method to compensate for silver lost from the anode by mechanical causes, and conducted an isotope analysis of the silver used to determine its atomic weight. Their value for the conventional Faraday constant was F_{90} = 96485.39(13) C/mol, which corresponds to a value for the Avogadro constant of 6.0221449(78)×10^{23} mol^{−1}: both values have a relative standard uncertainty of 1.3×10^{−6}.

=== Electron mass measurement ===
In practice, the atomic mass constant is determined from the electron rest mass m_{e} and the electron relative atomic mass A_{r}(e) (that is, the mass of electron divided by the atomic mass constant). The relative atomic mass of the electron can be measured in cyclotron experiments, while the rest mass of the electron can be derived from other physical constants.
$$\begin{align}
m_\text{u} &= \frac{m_\text{e}}{A_\text{r}(\text{e})}
= \frac{2R_\infty h}{A_\text{r}(\text{e}) c \alpha^2}
= \frac{M_\text{u}}{N_\text{A}} , \\[1ex]
N_\text{A} &= \frac{M_\text{u} A_\text{r}(\text{e})}{m_\text{e}} = \frac{M_\text{u} A_\text{r}(\text{e}) c\alpha^2}{2R_\infty h} ,
\end{align}$$
where c is the speed of light, h is the Planck constant, α is the fine-structure constant, and R_{∞} is the Rydberg constant.

As may be observed from the old values (2014 CODATA) in the table below, the main limiting factor in the precision of the Avogadro constant was the uncertainty in the value of the Planck constant, as all the other constants that contribute to the calculation were known more precisely.

Constant	Symbol	2014 CODATA values	Relative standard uncertainty	Correlation coefficient with N_{A}
Molar mass constant	M_{u}	1 g/mol	0 (defined)	—
Rydberg constant	R_{∞}	10973731.568508(65) m^{−1}	5.9×10^{−12}	−0.0002
Planck constant	h	6.626070040(81)×10^{−34} J⋅s	1.2×10^{−8}	−0.9993
Speed of light	c	299792458 m/s	0 (defined)	—
Avogadro constant	N_{A}	6.022140857(74)×10^{23} mol^{−1}	1.2×10^{−8}	1

The power of having defined values of universal constants as is presently the case can be understood from the table below (2018 CODATA).

Constant	Symbol	2018 CODATA values	Relative standard uncertainty	Correlation coefficient with N_{A}
Molar mass constant	M_{u}	0.99999999965(30) g/mol	3.0×10^{−10}	—
Rydberg constant	R_{∞}	10973731.568160(21) m^{−1}	1.9×10^{−12}	—
Planck constant	h	6.62607015×10^{−34} J⋅s	0 (defined)	—
Speed of light	c	299792458 m/s	0 (defined)	—
Avogadro constant	N_{A}	6.02214076×10^{23} mol^{−1}	0 (defined)	—

=== X-ray crystal density methods ===
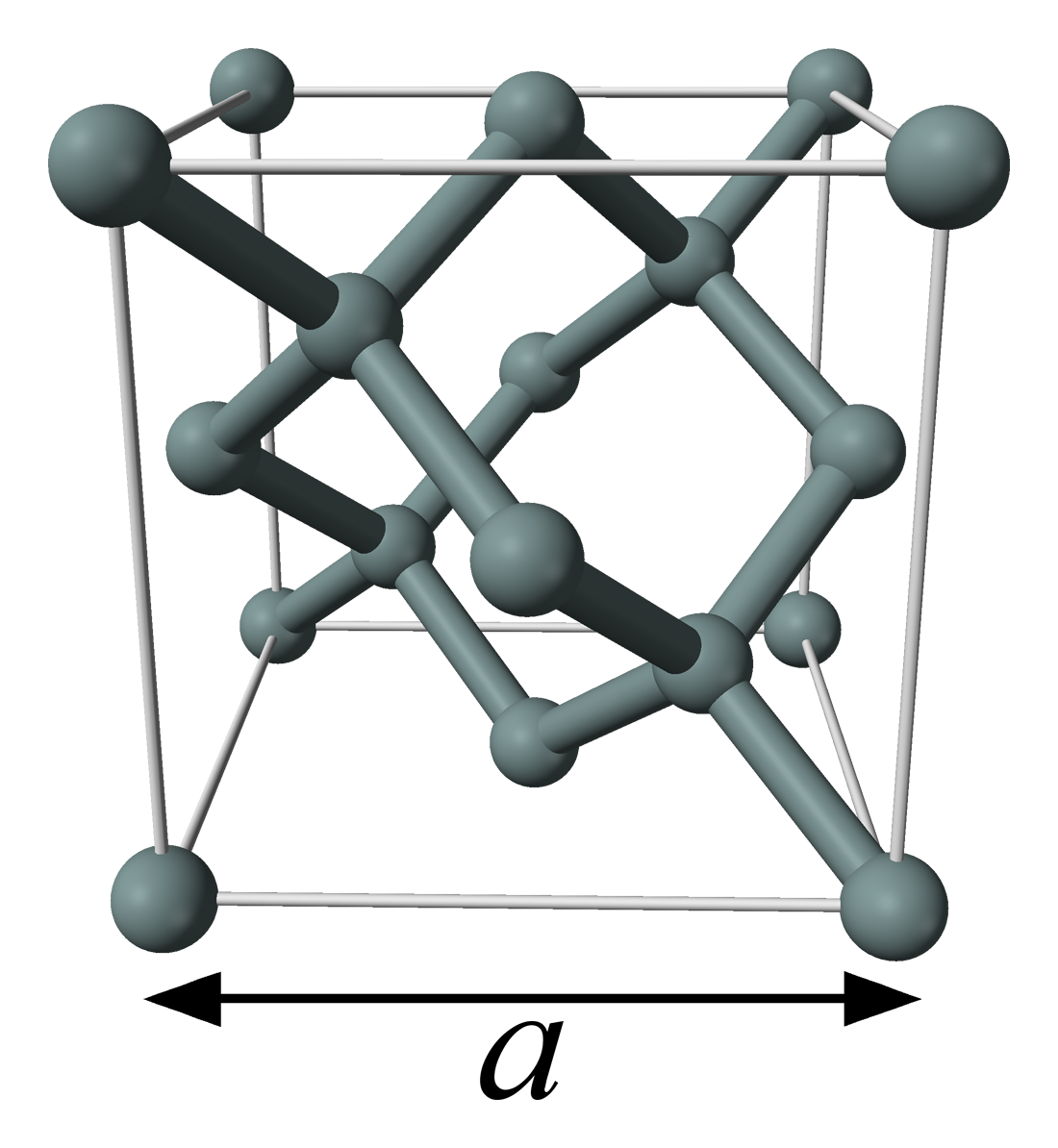
Ball-and-stick model of the unit cell of silicon. X-ray diffraction measures the cell parameter, a, which is used to calculate a value for the Avogadro constant.

Silicon single crystals may be produced today in commercial facilities with extremely high purity and with few lattice defects. This method defined the Avogadro constant as the ratio of the molar volume, V_{m}, to the atomic volume V_{atom}:
$$N_\text{A} = \frac{V_\text{m}}{V_\text{atom}},$$
where V_{atom} = V_{cell}/n and n is the number of atoms per unit cell of volume V_{cell}.

The unit cell of silicon has a cubic packing arrangement of 8 atoms, and the unit cell volume may be measured by determining a single unit cell parameter, the length a of one of the sides of the cube. The CODATA value of a for silicon is 5.431020511(89)×10^{−10} m.

In practice, X-ray crystallography measurements are carried out on a distance known as d_{220}(Si), which is the distance between the planes denoted by the Miller indices {220}, and is equal to a/√8.

The isotope proportional composition of the sample used must be measured and taken into account. Silicon occurs in three stable isotopes (^{28}Si, ^{29}Si, ^{30}Si), and the natural variation in their proportions is greater than other uncertainties in the measurements. The atomic weight A_{r} for the sample crystal can be calculated, as the standard atomic weights of the three nuclides are known with great accuracy. This, together with the measured density ρ of the sample, allows the molar volume V_{m} to be determined:
$$V_\text{m} = \frac{A_\text{r}M_\text{u}}{\rho},$$
where M_{u} is the molar mass constant. The CODATA value for the molar volume of silicon is 1.205883199(60)×10^{−5} m^{3}⋅mol^{−1}, with a relative standard uncertainty of 4.9×10^{−8}.

== See also ==
- Mass (mass spectrometry)
  - Kendrick mass
  - Monoisotopic mass
- Mass-to-charge ratio
