= Orbitrap =

Type of ion separator used in mass spectrometry

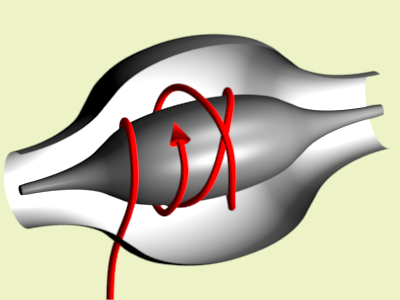
Ion trajectories in an Orbitrap mass spectrometer

In mass spectrometry, Orbitrap is an ion trap mass analyzer consisting of an outer barrel-like electrode and a coaxial inner spindle-like electrode that traps ions in an orbital motion around the spindle. The image current from the trapped ions is detected and converted to a mass spectrum by first using the Fourier transform of time domain of the harmonic to create a frequency signal which is converted to mass.

== History ==
The concept of electrostatically trapping ions in an orbit around a central spindle was developed by Kenneth Hay Kingdon in the early 1920s. The Kingdon trap consists of a thin central wire and an outer cylindrical electrode. A static applied voltage results in a radial logarithmic potential between the electrodes. In 1981, Knight introduced a modified outer electrode that included an axial quadrupole term that confines the ions on the trap axis. Neither the Kingdon nor the Knight configurations were reported to produce mass spectra.

In 1986, Professor Yuri Konstantinovich Golikov in USSR developed theory of ion motion in quadro-logarithmic potential, and filed for patents in USSR for its use in a time-of-flight analyzer. Golikov, leading a team at the St. Petersburg State Pedagogical University's Radiophysics Faculty, laid the theoretical groundwork for Orbitrap technology as one of inventors in USSR Inventor's certificate No. 1247973 in 1986. Golikov later remarked "Based on my ideas, analytical instruments with record parameters were built, but unfortunately not in Russia, but abroad."

Contrary to popular belief, Alexander Makarov is not the original inventor of quadro-logarithmic potential which was known since 1950s. Reflecting on his early interaction with Golikov, Alexander Makarov recalled, "As a fifth-year student at MIPT, I entered one of the numerous rooms at the Polytechnic Institute, where I was met by Yuri Konstantinovich Golikov. I was holding excerpts (photocopies were not so accessible then) from the author's certificate USSR № 1247973 to which I have referred in all my works on the Orbitrap™ analyzer since then."

Alexander Makarov's effort in commercializing Orbitrap analyzer at the end of the 1990s required a number of innovations such as image current detection, C-trap for ion injection, and other technology improvements which resulted in the commercial introduction of this analyzer by Thermo Fisher Scientific as a part of the hybrid LTQ Orbitrap instrument in 2005.

== Principle of operation ==
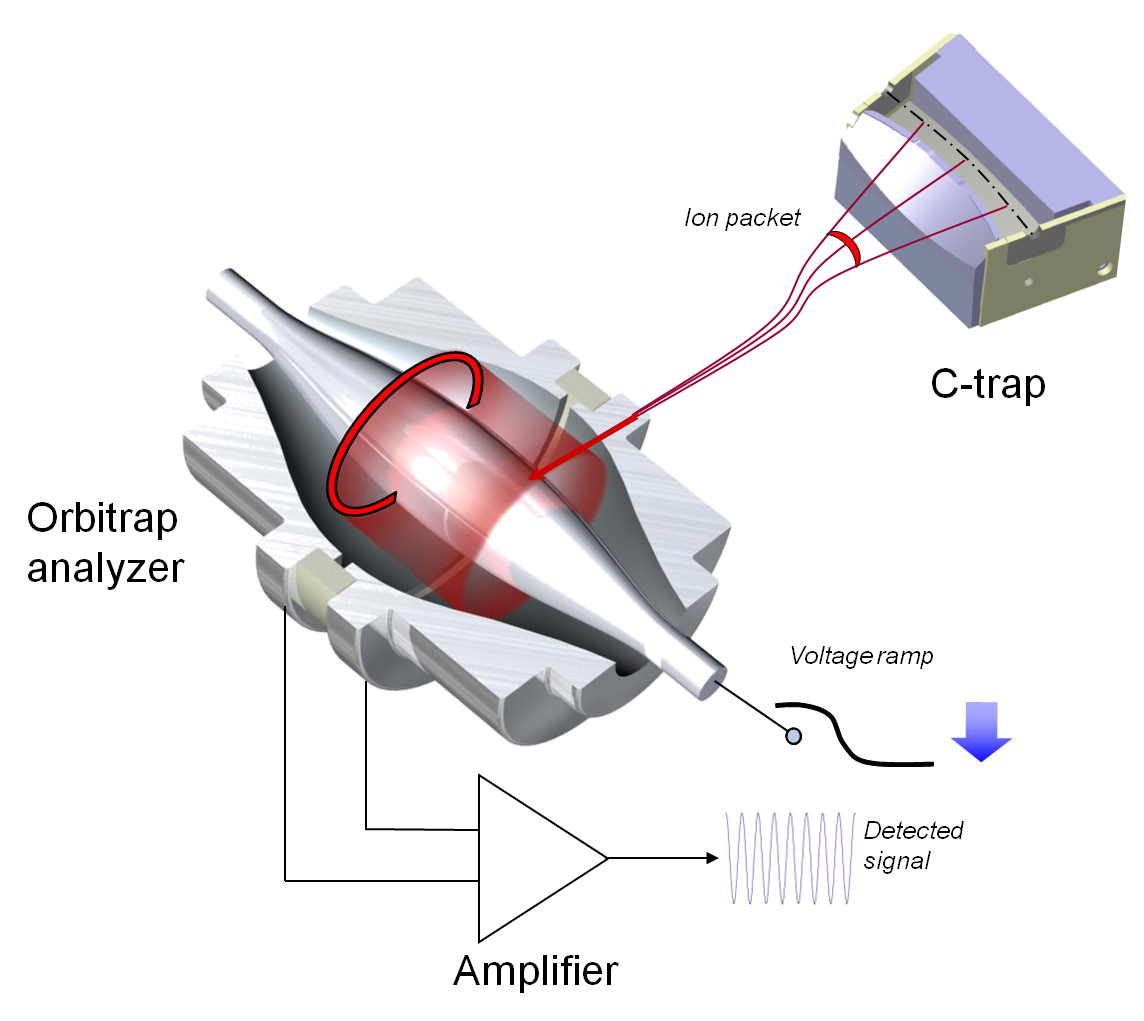
Cross-section of the C-trap and Orbitrap analyzer (ion optics and differential pumping not shown). Ion packet enters the analyzer during the voltage ramp and form rings that induce current detected by the amplifier.

=== Trapping ===
In the Orbitrap, ions are trapped because their electrostatic attraction to the inner electrode is balanced by their inertia. Thus, ions cycle around the inner electrode on elliptical trajectories. In addition, the ions also move back and forth along the axis of the central electrode so that their trajectories in space resemble helices. Due to the properties of the quadro-logarithmic potential, their axial motion is harmonic, i.e. it is completely independent not only of motion around the inner electrode but also of all initial parameters of the ions except their mass-to-charge ratios m/z. Its angular frequency is: ω = √k/(m/z), where k is the force constant of the potential, similar to the spring constant.

=== Injection ===
In order to inject ions from an external ion source, the field between the electrodes is first reduced. As ion packets are injected tangentially into the field, the electric field is increased by ramping the voltage on the inner electrode. Ions get squeezed towards the inner electrode until they reach the desired orbit inside the trap. At that moment ramping is stopped, the field becomes static, and detection can start. Each packet contains a multitude of ions of different velocities spread over a certain volume. These ions move with different rotational frequencies but with the same axial frequency. This means that ions of a specific mass-to-charge ratio spread into rings which oscillate along the inner spindle.

Proof-of-principle of the technology was carried out using the direct injection of ions from an external laser desorption and ionization ion source. This method of injection works well with pulsed sources such as MALDI but cannot be interfaced to continuous ion sources like electrospray.

All commercial Orbitrap mass spectrometers utilize a curved linear trap for ion injection (C-trap). By rapidly ramping down trapping RF voltages and applying DC gradients across the C-trap, ions can be bunched into short packets similar to those from the laser ion source. The C-trap is tightly integrated with the analyzer, injection optics and differential pumping.

=== Excitation ===
In principle, coherent axial oscillations of ion rings could be excited by applying RF waveforms to the outer electrode as demonstrated in and references therein. However, if ion packets are injected away from the minimum of the axial potential (which corresponds to the thickest part of either electrode), this automatically initiates their axial oscillations, eliminating the need for any additional excitation. Furthermore, the absence of additional excitation allows the detection process to start as soon as the detection electronics recover from the voltage ramp needed for ion injection.

=== Detection ===
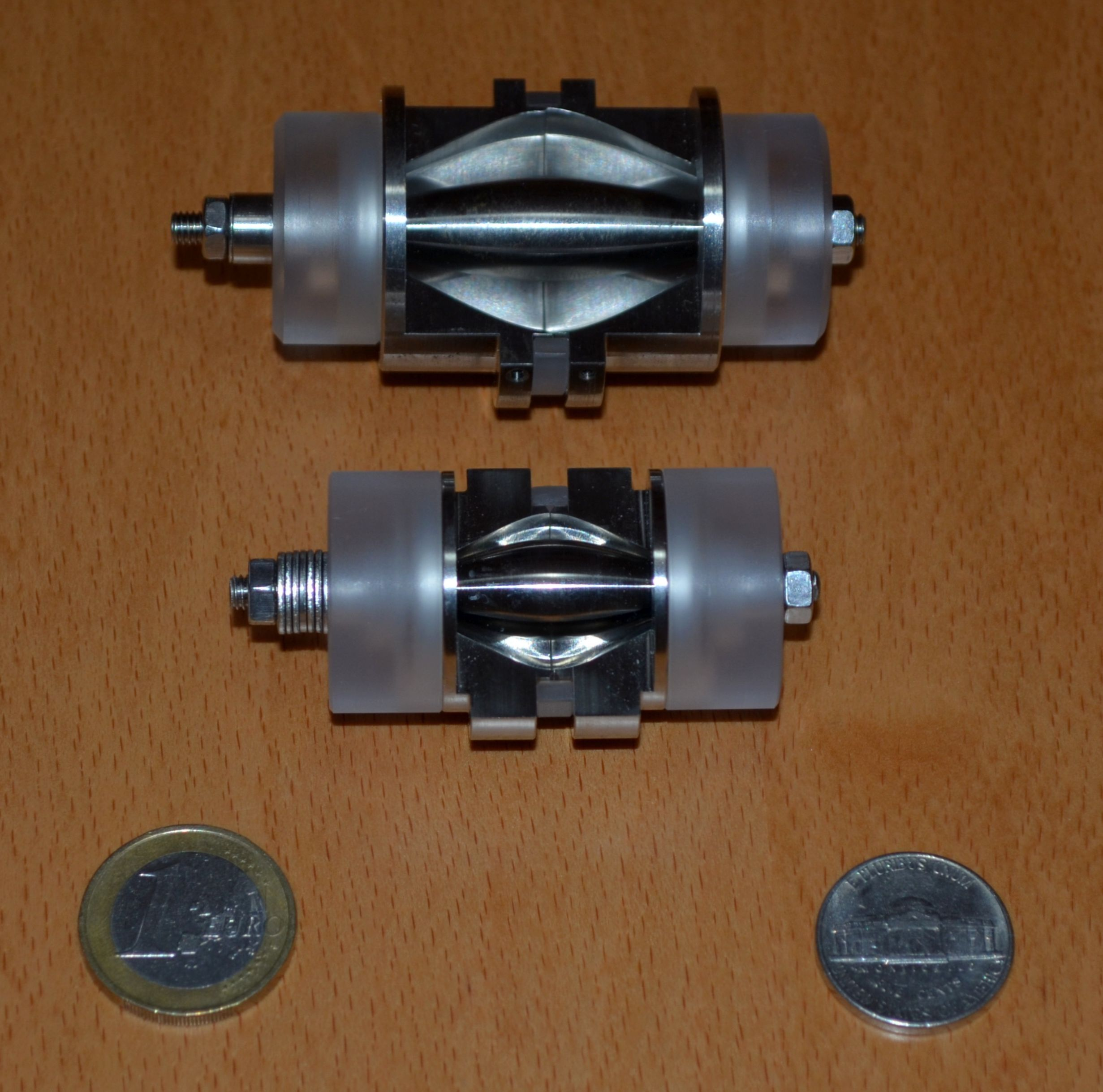
Cut-outs of a standard (top) and a high-field (bottom) Orbitrap analyzer

Axial oscillations of ion rings are detected by their image current induced on the outer electrode which is split into two symmetrical pick-up sensors connected to a differential amplifier. By processing data in a manner similar to that used in Fourier-transform ion cyclotron resonance mass spectrometry (FTICR-MS), the trap can be used as a mass analyzer. Like in FTICR-MS, all the ions are detected simultaneously over some given period of time and resolution can be improved by increasing the strength of the field or by increasing the detection period. The Orbitrap differs from FTICR-MS by the absence of a magnetic field and hence has a significantly slower decrease of resolving power with increasing m/z.

== Variants ==
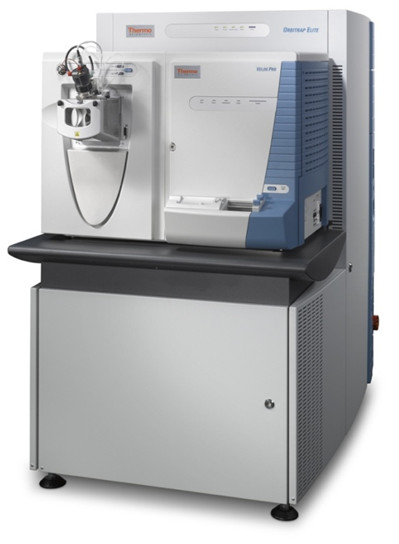
LTQ Orbitrap

Currently the Orbitrap analyzer exists in two variants: a standard trap and a compact high-field trap. In practical traps, the outer electrode is sustained at virtual ground and a voltage of 3.5 or 5 kV is applied to the inner electrode only. As a result, the resolving power at m/z 400 and 768 ms detection time can range from 60,000 for a standard trap at 3.5 kV to 280,000 for a high-field trap at 5 kV and with enhanced FT processing. Like in FTICR-MS the Orbitrap resolving power is proportional to the number of harmonic oscillations of the ions; as a result, the resolving power is inversely proportional to the square root of m/z and proportional to acquisition time. For example, the values above would double for m/z 100 and halve for m/z 1600. For the shortest transient of 96 ms these values would be reduced by 8 times, whereas a resolving power in excess of 1,000,000 has been demonstrated in 3-second transients.

The Orbitrap analyzer can be interfaced to a linear ion trap (LTQ Orbitrap family of instruments), quadrupole mass filter (Q Exactive family) or directly to an ion source (Exactive instrument, all marketed by Thermo Fisher Scientific). In addition, a higher-energy collision cell can be appended to the C-trap, with the further addition of electron-transfer dissociation at its back. Most of these instruments have atmospheric pressure ion sources though an intermediate-pressure MALDI source can also be used (MALDI LTQ Orbitrap). All of these instruments provide a high mass accuracy (<2–3 ppm with external calibrant and <1–2 ppm with internal), a high resolving power (up to 240,000 at m/z 400), a high dynamic range and high sensitivity.

== Applications ==
Orbitrap-based mass spectrometers are used in proteomics and are also used in life science mass spectrometry such as metabolism, metabolomics, environmental, food and safety analysis. Most of them are interfaced to liquid chromatography separations, though they are also used with gas chromatography, secondary ion and ambient ionization methods. Orbitrap mass spectrometers have also been used to determine bulk and position-specific isotope ratios at natural abundance.

== See also ==
- Fourier-transform ion cyclotron resonance
