= Alan G. Marshall =

American analytical chemist (born 1944)

- Born: May 26, 1944; Bluffton, Ohio, U.S.
- Died: June 6, 2025 (aged 81); Tallahassee, Florida, U.S.
- Education: Northwestern University; Stanford University
- Known for: Fourier transform ion cyclotron resonance
- Awards: Distinguished Contribution in Mass Spectrometry (1999); Thomson Medal (2000); Chemical Pioneer Award (2007); William H. Nichols Medal (2012); Pittsburgh Analytical Chemistry Award (2012)
- Scientific career
- Fields: Chemistry
- Workplaces: University of British Columbia; Ohio State University; Florida State University

Alan G. Marshall (May 26, 1944 – June 6, 2025) was an American analytical chemist who devoted his scientific career to developing a scientific technique known as Fourier transform ion cyclotron resonance (FT-ICR) mass spectrometry, which he co-invented.

He was born in Bluffton, Ohio, in 1944, and earned his bachelor's in chemistry from Northwestern University (1965) and Ph.D. in chemistry from Stanford University (1970). His first academic appointment was at the University of British Columbia. In 1980, he moved to the Ohio State University where he remained until 1993.

He was the Robert O. Lawton Professor of Chemistry and Biochemistry at Florida State University and director of the Ion Cyclotron Resonance Program at the National High Magnetic Field Laboratory.

He was a fellow of the American Chemical Society, American Physical Society, and the American Association for the Advancement of Science, and received numerous awards, including the 2000 Thomson Medal given by the International Mass Spectrometry Foundation; the 2007 Chemical Pioneer Award, given by the American Institute of Chemists; the 2012 William H. Nichols Medal, given by the New York Section of the American Chemical Society; and the 2012 Pittsburgh Analytical Chemistry Award, given by the Society for Analytical Chemists of Pittsburgh.

Marshall died on June 6, 2025.

== See also ==
- Petroleomics
