= Mass spectrum =

Tool in chemical analysis

A mass spectrum is a histogram plot of intensity vs. mass-to-charge ratio (m/z) in a chemical sample, usually acquired using an instrument called a mass spectrometer. Not all mass spectra of a given substance are the same; for example, some mass spectrometers break the analyte molecules into fragments; others observe the intact molecular masses with little fragmentation. A mass spectrum can represent many different types of information based on the type of mass spectrometer and the specific experiment applied. Common fragmentation processes for organic molecules are the McLafferty rearrangement and alpha cleavage. Straight chain alkanes and alkyl groups produce a typical series of peaks: 29 (CH_{3}CH_{2}^{+}), 43 (CH_{3}CH_{2}CH_{2}^{+}), 57 (CH_{3}CH_{2}CH_{2}CH_{2}^{+}), 71 (CH_{3}CH_{2}CH_{2}CH_{2}CH_{2}^{+}) etc.

== X-axis: m/z (mass-to-charge ratio) ==
The x-axis of a mass spectrum represents a relationship between the mass of a given ion and the number of elementary charges that it carries. This is written as the IUPAC standard m/z to denote the quantity formed by dividing the mass of an ion (in daltons) by the dalton unit and by its charge number (positive absolute value). Thus, m/z is a dimensionless quantity with no associated units. Despite carrying neither units of mass nor charge, the m/z is referred to as the mass-to-charge ratio of an ion. However, this is distinct from the mass-to-charge ratio, m/Q (SI standard units kg/C), which is commonly used in physics. The m/z is used in applied mass spectrometry because convenient and intuitive numerical relationships naturally arise when interpreting spectra. A single m/z value alone does not contain sufficient information to determine the mass or charge of an ion. However, mass information may be extracted when considering the whole spectrum, such as the spacing of isotopes or the observation of multiple charge states of the same molecule. These relationships and the relationship to the mass of the ion in daltons tend toward approximately rational number values in m/z space. For example, ions with one charge exhibit spacing between isotopes of 1 and the mass of the ion in daltons is numerically equal to the m/z. The IUPAC Gold Book gives an example of appropriate use: "for the ion C_{7}H_{7}^{2+}, m/z equals 45.5".

=== Alternative x-axis notations ===
There are several alternatives to the standard m/z notation that appear in the literature; however, these are not currently accepted by standards organizations and most journals. m/e appears in older historical literature. A label more consistent with the IUPAC green book and ISO 31 conventions is m/Q or m/q where m is the symbol for mass and Q or q the symbol for charge with the units u/e or Da/e. This notation is not uncommon in the physics of mass spectrometry but is rarely used as the abscissa of a mass spectrum. It was also suggested to introduce a new unit thomson (Th) as a unit of m/z, where 1 Th = 1 u/e. According to this convention, mass spectra x axis could be labeled m/z (Th) and negative ions would have negative values. This notation is rare and not accepted by IUPAC or any other standards organisation.

=== History of x-axis notation ===
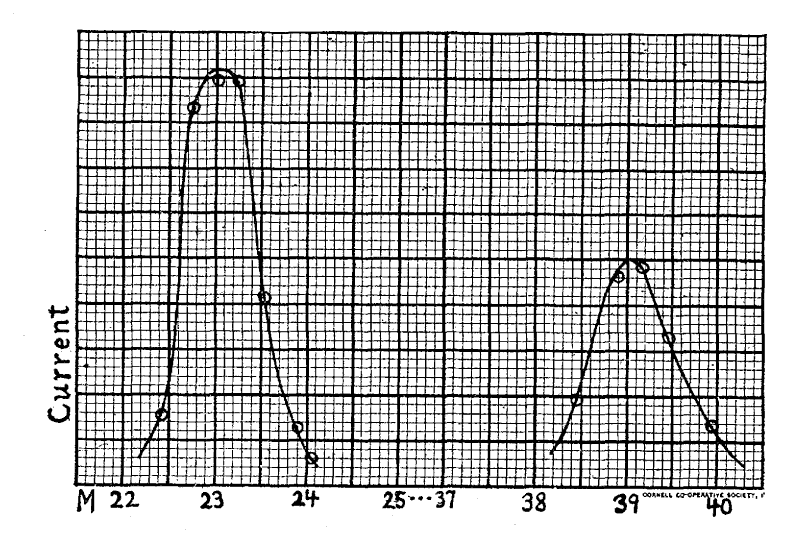
Mass spectrum of sodium and potassium positive ions from Arthur Dempster's 1918 publication "A new Method of Positive Ray Analysis " Phys. Rev. 11, 316 (1918)

In 1897 the mass-to-charge ratio $m/e$ of the electron was first measured by J. J. Thomson. By doing this he showed that the electron, which was postulated before in order to explain electricity, was in fact a particle with a mass and a charge and that its mass-to-charge ratio was much smaller than the one for the hydrogen ion H^{+}. In 1913 he measured the mass-to-charge ratio of ions with an instrument he called a parabola spectrograph. Although this data was not represented as a modern mass spectrum, it was similar in meaning. Eventually there was a change to the notation as m/e giving way to the current standard of m/z.

Early in mass spectrometry research the resolution of mass spectrometers did not allow for accurate mass determination. Francis William Aston won the Nobel prize in Chemistry in 1922. "For his discovery, by means of his mass spectrograph, of isotopes, in a large number of non-radioactive elements, and for his enunciation of the Whole Number Rule." In which he stated that all atoms (including isotopes) follow a whole-number rule This implied that the masses of atoms were not on a scale but could be expressed as integers (in fact multiple charged ions were rare, so for the most part the ratio was whole as well). There have been several suggestions (e.g. the unit thomson) to change the official mass spectrometry nomenclature $m/z$ to be more internally consistent.

== Y-axis: signal intensity ==
The y-axis of a mass spectrum represents signal intensity of the ions. When using counting detectors the intensity is often measured in counts per second (cps). When using analog detection electronics the intensity is typically measured in volts. In FTICR and Orbitraps the frequency domain signal (the y-axis) is related to the power (~amplitude squared) of the signal sine wave (often reduced to an rms power); however, the axis is usually not labeled as such for many reasons. In most forms of mass spectrometry, the intensity of ion current measured by the spectrometer does not accurately represent relative abundance, but correlates loosely with it. Therefore, it is common to label the y-axis with "arbitrary units".

=== Y-axis and relative abundance ===
Signal intensity may be dependent on many factors, especially the nature of the molecules being analyzed and how they ionize. The efficiency of ionization varies from molecule to molecule and from ion source to ion source. For example, in electrospray sources in positive ion mode a quaternary amine will ionize exceptionally well whereas a large hydrophobic alcohol will most likely not be seen no matter how concentrated. In an EI source these molecules will behave very differently. Additionally there may be factors that affect ion transmission disproportionally between ionization and detection.

On the detection side there are many factors that can also affect signal intensity in a non-proportional way. The size of the ion will affect the velocity of impact and with certain detectors the velocity is proportional to the signal output. In other detection systems, such as FTICR, the number of charges on the ion are more important to signal intensity. In Fourier transform ion cyclotron resonance and Orbitrap type mass spectrometers the signal intensity (Y-axis) is related to the amplitude of the free induction decay signal. This is fundamentally a power relationship (amplitude squared) but often computed as an [rms]. For decaying signals the rms is not equal to the average amplitude. Additionally the damping constant (decay rate of the signal in the fid) is not the same for all ions. In order to make conclusions about relative intensity a great deal of knowledge and care is required.

A common way to get more quantitative information out of a mass spectrum is to create a standard curve to compare the sample to. This requires knowing what is to be quantitated ahead of time, having a standard available and designing the experiment specifically for this purpose. A more advanced variation on this is the use of an internal standard which behaves very similarly to the analyte. This is often an isotopically labeled version of the analyte. There are forms of mass spectrometry, such as accelerator mass spectrometry that are designed from the bottom up to be quantitative.

=== Spectral skewing ===
Spectral skewing is the change in relative intensity of mass spectral peaks due to the changes in concentration of the analyte in the ion source as the mass spectrum is scanned. This situation occurs routinely as chromatographic components elute into a continuous ion source. Spectral skewing is not observed in ion trap (quadrupole (this has been seen also in QMS) or magnetic) or time-of-flight (TOF) mass analyzers because potentially all ions formed in operational cycle (a snapshot in time) of the instrument are available for detection.

== See also ==
- Kendrick mass
