= UGT8 =

Protein-coding gene in the species Homo sapiens

Identifiers
- Aliases: UGT8, CGT, UGT4, UDP glycosyltransferase 8, GalCer Synthase, Ceramide Galactosyltransferase
- External IDs: OMIM: 601291; MGI: 109522; GeneCards: UGT8
Enzyme activity
EC #	BRENDA	ExPASy	KEGG	MetaCyc
2.4.1.47	↗	↗	↗	↗

Gene location (Human)
Chr.	Chromosome 4 (human)
Band	4q26	Start	114,598,770 bp
Band	4q26	End	114,678,225 bp

Gene location (Mouse)
Chr.	Chromosome 3 (mouse)
Band	3|3 G1	Start	125,658,920 bp
Band	3|3 G1	End	125,732,268 bp
RNA expression pattern
Bgee	Human / Mouse (ortholog); Top expressed in: inferior ganglion of vagus nerve; corpus callosum; subthalamic nucleus; superior vestibular nucleus; C1 segment; pons; external globus pallidus; pars reticulata; ventral tegmental area; pars compacta / Top expressed in: deep cerebellar nuclei; pontine nuclei; ventral tegmental area; lateral geniculate nucleus; globus pallidus; dorsal tegmental nucleus; substantia nigra; lateral hypothalamus; medial geniculate nucleus; medial vestibular nucleus; More reference expression data
BioGPS	n/a
Gene ontology
Molecular function	hexosyltransferase activity; glycosyltransferase activity; glucuronosyltransferase activity; transferase activity; N-acylsphingosine galactosyltransferase activity; UDP-galactose:glucosylceramide beta-1,4-galactosyltransferase activity; UDP-glycosyltransferase activity
Cellular component	integral component of membrane; membrane; intracellular membrane-bounded organelle; plasma membrane
Biological process	lipid metabolism; neuron projection morphogenesis; galactosylceramide biosynthetic process; glycosphingolipid metabolic process; peripheral nervous system development; central nervous system development; paranodal junction assembly; metabolism; protein localization to paranode region of axon; cytoskeleton organization; sphingolipid metabolic process
Sources:Amigo / QuickGO
Orthologs
Databases	NCBI: entry; OMA: entry
Species	Human	Mouse
Entrez	7368	22239
Ensembl	ENSG00000174607	ENSMUSG00000032854
UniProt	Q16880	Q64676
RefSeq (mRNA)	NM_001128174; NM_003360; NM_001322112; NM_001322113; NM_001322114	NM_011674
RefSeq (protein)	NP_001121646; NP_001309041; NP_001309042; NP_001309043; NP_003351	NP_035804
Location (UCSC)	Chr 4: 114.6 – 114.68 Mb	Chr 3: 125.66 – 125.73 Mb
PubMed search
- Wikidata
View/Edit Human	View/Edit Mouse

2-hydroxyacylsphingosine 1-beta-galactosyltransferase is an enzyme that in humans is encoded by the UGT8 gene.

== Function ==
Galactocerebrosides are abundant sphingolipids of the myelin membrane of the central nervous system and peripheral nervous system and are also present in small amounts in kidney. The key enzymatic step in the biosynthesis of galactocerebrosides consists of the transfer of galactose to ceramide catalyzed by UDP-galactose ceramide galactosyltransferase (CGT, EC 2.4.1.45). The enzyme encoded by the CGT gene is the first involved in complex lipid biosynthesis in the myelinating oligodendrocyte.
