= C18H39NO2 =

The molecular formula C_{18}H_{39}NO_{2} may refer to:

- Ammonium stearate
- Safingol
- Sphinganine
