= ASAH2 =

Protein-coding gene in humans

Identifiers
- Aliases: ASAH2, BCDase, HNAC1, LCDase, N-CDase, NCDase, N-acylsphingosine amidohydrolase (non-lysosomal ceramidase) 2, N-acylsphingosine amidohydrolase 2
- External IDs: OMIM: 611202; MGI: 1859310; GeneCards: ASAH2
Available structures
PDB	Ortholog search: PDBe RCSB
PDB	List of PDB id codes 4WGK
Enzyme activity
EC #	BRENDA	ExPASy	KEGG	MetaCyc
3.5.1.23	↗	↗	↗	↗

Gene location (Human)
Chr.	Chromosome 10 (human)
Band	10q11.23	Start	50,182,778 bp
Band	10q11.23	End	50,279,720 bp

Gene location (Mouse)
Chr.	Chromosome 19 (mouse)
Band	19|19 C1	Start	31,959,997 bp
Band	19|19 C1	End	32,085,611 bp
RNA expression pattern
Bgee	Human / Mouse (ortholog); Top expressed in: duodenum; gonad; testicle; stromal cell of endometrium; islet of Langerhans; smooth muscle tissue; ganglionic eminence; muscle of thigh; tonsil; skeletal muscle tissue / Top expressed in: epithelium of small intestine; intestinal villus; jejunum; lacrimal gland; duodenum; esophagus; parotid gland; Epithelium of choroid plexus; deep cerebellar nuclei; motor neuron; More reference expression data
BioGPS	n/a
Gene ontology
Molecular function	hydrolase activity; ceramidase activity; calcium ion binding; zinc ion binding; N-acylsphingosine amidohydrolase activity; metal ion binding
Cellular component	integral component of membrane; plasma membrane; membrane; mitochondrion; extracellular region
Biological process	lipid metabolism; sphingolipid metabolic process; apoptotic process; sphingosine metabolic process; ceramide metabolic process; response to organic substance; long-chain fatty acid biosynthetic process; sphingosine biosynthetic process; ceramide catabolic process
Sources:Amigo / QuickGO
Orthologs
Databases	NCBI: entry; OMA: entry
Species	Human	Mouse
Entrez	56624	54447
Ensembl	ENSG00000188611	ENSMUSG00000024887
UniProt	Q9NR71	Q9JHE3
RefSeq (mRNA)	NM_001143974; NM_019893	NM_018830
RefSeq (protein)	NP_001137446; NP_063946	NP_061300
Location (UCSC)	Chr 10: 50.18 – 50.28 Mb	Chr 19: 31.96 – 32.09 Mb
PubMed search
- Wikidata
View/Edit Human	View/Edit Mouse

Neutral ceramidase is an enzyme that in humans is encoded by the ASAH2 gene. This enzyme is a ceramidase, a type of enzyme that acts on ceramide to produce sphingosine.
