= ACER1 =

Protein-coding gene in the species Homo sapiens

Identifiers
- Aliases: ACER1, ALKCDase1, ASAH3, alkaline ceramidase 1
- External IDs: OMIM: 613491; MGI: 2181962; GeneCards: ACER1
Enzyme activity
EC #	BRENDA	ExPASy	KEGG	MetaCyc
3.5.1.23	↗	↗	↗	↗

Gene location (Human)
Chr.	Chromosome 19 (human)
Band	19p13.3	Start	6,306,142 bp
Band	19p13.3	End	6,333,612 bp

Gene location (Mouse)
Chr.	Chromosome 17 (mouse)
Band	17|17 D	Start	57,260,490 bp
Band	17|17 D	End	57,289,126 bp
RNA expression pattern
Bgee	Human / Mouse (ortholog); Top expressed in: skin of leg; skin of abdomen; skin of thigh; vulva; human penis; nipple; oral cavity; vagina; lymph node; ectocervix / Top expressed in: skin of external ear; lip; condyle; skin of back; epithelium of stomach; left colon; epidermis; skin of abdomen; Paneth cell; hair follicle; More reference expression data
BioGPS	n/a
Gene ontology
Molecular function	dihydroceramidase activity; hydrolase activity, acting on carbon-nitrogen (but not peptide) bonds, in linear amides; hydrolase activity; N-acylsphingosine amidohydrolase activity; ceramidase activity; metal ion binding
Cellular component	membrane; integral component of membrane; endoplasmic reticulum membrane; endoplasmic reticulum
Biological process	cellular response to calcium ion; regulation of lipid metabolic process; cell differentiation; sphingosine biosynthetic process; sphingolipid biosynthetic process; response to alkaline pH; keratinocyte differentiation; ceramide metabolic process; epidermis development; lipid metabolism; ceramide catabolic process; sphingolipid metabolic process; regulation of water loss via skin; sebaceous gland development
Sources:Amigo / QuickGO
Orthologs
Databases	NCBI: entry; OMA: entry
Species	Human	Mouse
Entrez	125981	171168
Ensembl	ENSG00000167769	ENSMUSG00000045019
UniProt	Q8TDN7	Q8R4X1
RefSeq (mRNA)	NM_133492	NM_175731
RefSeq (protein)	NP_597999	NP_783858
Location (UCSC)	Chr 19: 6.31 – 6.33 Mb	Chr 17: 57.26 – 57.29 Mb
PubMed search
- Wikidata
View/Edit Human	View/Edit Mouse

Alkaline ceramidase 1 also known as ACER1 is a ceramidase enzyme which in humans is encoded by the ACER1 gene.

== Function ==
ACER1 mediates cellular differentiation by controlling the generation of sphingosine (SPH) and sphingosine-1-phosphate (S1P).
