= Safingol =

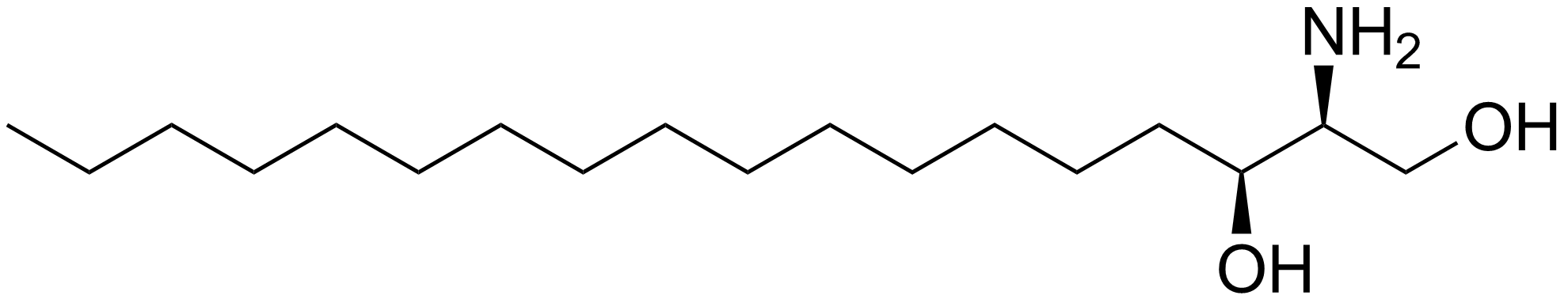

Names
- Preferred IUPAC name (2S,3S)-2-Aminooctadecane-1,3-diol
- Other names (−)-threo-Dihydrosphingosine; (2S,3S)-2-Amino-1,3-octadecanediol; L-(−)-threo-Sphinganine; L-threo-Dihydrosphingosine; L-threo-2-Amino-1,3-octadecanediol; threo-1,3-Dihydroxy-2-aminooctadecane

Identifiers
CAS Number	15639-50-6; 139755-79-6 (HCl)
3D model (JSmol)	Interactive image
ChemSpider	2319840
PubChem CID	3058739
UNII	OWA98U788S; 30MA50WJ4N (HCl)
CompTox Dashboard (EPA)	DTXSID9045768
- InChI: InChI=1S/C18H39NO2/c1-2-3-4-5-6-7-8-9-10-11-12-13-14-15-18(21)17(19)16-20/h17-18,20-21H,2-16,19H2,1H3/t17-,18-/m0/s1 Key: OTKJDMGTUTTYMP-ROUUACIJSA-N; InChI=1/C18H39NO2/c1-2-3-4-5-6-7-8-9-10-11-12-13-14-15-18(21)17(19)16-20/h17-18,20-21H,2-16,19H2,1H3/t17-,18-/m0/s1 Key: OTKJDMGTUTTYMP-ROUUACIJBJ
- SMILES: OC[C@H](N)[C@@H](O)CCCCCCCCCCCCCCC

Properties
Chemical formula	C_{18}H_{39}NO_{2}
Molar mass	301.515 g·mol^{−1}
- Except where otherwise noted, data are given for materials in their standard state (at 25 °C [77 °F], 100 kPa). verify (what is ?) Infobox references

Safingol is a lyso-sphingolipid protein kinase inhibitor. It has the molecular formula C_{18}H_{39}NO_{2} and is a colorless solid. Medicinally, safingol has demonstrated promising anticancer potential as a modulator of multi-drug resistance and as an inducer of necrosis. The administration of safingol alone has not been shown to exert a significant effect on tumor cell growth. However, preclinical and clinical studies have shown that combining safingol with conventional chemotherapy agents such as fenretinide, vinblastine, irinotecan and mitomycin C can dramatically potentiate their antitumor effects. In phase I clinical trials, it was found to be safe to co-administer with cisplatin, but caused reversible dose-dependent hepatotoxicity.

== Mechanism ==
The underlying mechanism by which safingol induces cell death is poorly understood. It is believed to exert a variety of inhibitory effects, resulting in a series of cascades that result in accidental necrotic cell death brought about by reactive oxygen species (ROS) and mediated by autophagy. Increased autophagic activity has been associated with increased cellular death, although it is unclear if there is any causative relationship between the two. Because autophagy normally plays a pro-survival role by impeding apoptosis, it is curious that it may play a role in cell death following safingol exposure.

Safingol competitively competes with phorbol dibutyrate at regulatory domains of the protein kinase C family, inhibiting the activation of such enzymes as PKCβ-I, PKCδ, and PKCε. Safingol can also inhibit phosphoinositide 3-kinase (PI3k), which is a critical component of the mTOR and MAPK/ERK pathways. Furthermore, safingol, like other sphingolipids, has been found to inhibit glucose uptake. This results in oxidative stress, leading to the generation of ROS that are both time and concentration-dependent. Together, the inhibitory signaling effects (particularly of PKCε and PI3k) and the presence of ROS synergize to induce autophagy.

Following autophagic activity, cell death is eventually induced by an as of yet unknown mechanism. Missing from this cellular death are any signs of apoptotic induction such as characteristic changes to nuclear morphology and PARP cleavage. Instead, several hallmarks of necrosis are observed, such as caspase-independent cell death, the loss of plasma membrane integrity, the collapse of mitochondrial membrane potential, and the depletion of intracellular ATP. However, the involvement of RIPK1 has not been observed, suggesting that this necrosis is accidental in nature and not programmed.

One potential explanation for safingol’s cytotoxicity is that high concentrations result in ROS-related molecular and cellular damage that is beyond repair. Therefore, autophagy does not directly contribute to death, but is rather a failed attempt to preserve cell viability. However, not only does this hypothesis warrants further testing, but safingol has demonstrated unusual regulatory effects on other pathways capable of regulating autophagy.

As expected, a decrease in glucose heightens AMPK phosphorylation. However, an initial increase in phosphorylated mTOR is also observed, which eventually reduces after several hours. The mTOR pathway normally inhibits autophagy, as is induced by heightened glucose uptake. Therefore, decreasing glucose levels should suppress the mTOR pathway, allowing for autophagy. While autophagy is indeed observed following exposure of safingol, it is intriguing that mTOR is activated initially. Modulations in Bcl-2, Bcl-xL, and endonuclease G from mitochondria are also thought to play a role in safingol-induced cellular death by regulating autophagy.

Safingol is also a putative inhibitor of sphingosine kinase 1 (SphK), which catalyzes the production of sphingosine 1-phosphate (S1P), an important mediator of cancer cell growth, proliferation, invasion, and angiogenesis. This ability further contributes to its anticancer potential. It can also affect the balance of other endogenous sphingolipids, particularly ceramide and dihydroceramide, which have been implicated in autophagic induction and ROS production.

== See also ==
- Sphinganine, a related sphingolipid
