= Opaganib =

Chemical compound

Legal status
- Legal status: Investigational new drug

Identifiers
- IUPAC name: 3-(4-chlorophenyl)-N-(pyridin-4-ylmethyl)adamantane-1-carboxamide
- CAS Number: 915385-81-8
- PubChem CID: 15604015
- DrugBank: 12764
- ChemSpider: 13079494
- UNII: DRG21OQ517
- ChEBI: CHEBI:124965
- ChEMBL: ChEMBL2158685
- CompTox Dashboard (EPA): DTXSID801318727

Chemical and physical data
- Formula: C_{23}H_{25}ClN_{2}O
- Molar mass: 380.92 g·mol^{−1}
- 3D model (JSmol): Interactive image
- SMILES: C1C2CC3(CC1CC(C2)(C3)C(=O)NCC4=CC=NC=C4)C5=CC=C(C=C5)Cl
- InChI: InChI=1S/C23H25ClN2O/c24-20-3-1-19(2-4-20)22-10-17-9-18(11-22)13-23(12-17,15-22)21(27)26-14-16-5-7-25-8-6-16/h1-8,17-18H,9-15H2,(H,26,27); Key:CAOTVXGYTWCKQE-UHFFFAOYSA-N

Opaganib (ABC294640) is a drug which acts as an inhibitor of the enzyme sphingosine kinase 2, dihydroceramide desaturase (DES1), and glucosylceramide synthase (GCS). It is under development as a potential treatment agent for several different kinds of cancer. Opaganib has also demonstrated antiviral activity against SARS-CoV-2 and has shown a reduction in mortality among patients with moderately severe COVID-19 in a multinational Phase 2/3 clinical trial and also appeared to exhibiting anti-inflammatory effects by reducing levels of IL-6 and TNF-alpha.
