= Ceramide kinase =

ceramide kinase

Identifiers
- EC no.: 2.7.1.138
- CAS no.: 123175-68-8

Databases
- BRENDA: enzyme data
- ExPASy: NiceZyme view
- KEGG: enzyme entry
- MetaCyc: metabolic pathway
- Rhea: reactions
- PDB structures: RCSB PDB PDBe PDBsum
- Gene Ontology: AmiGO / QuickGO
Search
- PMC: articles
- PubMed: articles
- NCBI: proteins

In enzymology, a ceramide kinase, also abbreviated as CERK, (EC 2.7.1.138) is an enzyme that catalyzes the chemical reaction:

ATP + ceramide $\rightleftharpoons$ ADP + ceramide 1-phosphate

Thus, the two substrates of this enzyme are ATP and ceramide, whereas its two products are ADP and ceramide-1-phosphate.

This enzyme belongs to the family of transferases, specifically those transferring phosphorus-containing groups (phosphotransferases) with an alcohol group as acceptor. The systematic name of this enzyme class is ATP:ceramide 1-phosphotransferase. This enzyme is also called acylsphingosine kinase. This enzyme participates in sphingolipid metabolism.

== Gene ==
CERK

Identifiers
- Aliases: CERK, LK4, dA59H18.2, dA59H18.3, hceramide kinase
- External IDs: OMIM: 610307; MGI: 2386052; GeneCards: CERK
Enzyme activity
EC #	BRENDA	ExPASy	KEGG	MetaCyc
2.7.1.138	↗	↗	↗	↗

Gene location (Human)
Chr.	Chromosome 22 (human)
Band	22q13.31	Start	46,684,410 bp
Band	22q13.31	End	46,738,252 bp

Gene location (Mouse)
Chr.	Chromosome 15 (mouse)
Band	15|15 E2	Start	86,139,128 bp
Band	15|15 E2	End	86,186,141 bp
RNA expression pattern
Bgee	Human / Mouse (ortholog); Top expressed in: islet of Langerhans; pituitary gland; anterior pituitary; granulocyte; stromal cell of endometrium; ganglionic eminence; mucosa of ileum; left ventricle; decidua; right hemisphere of cerebellum / Top expressed in: lobe of cerebellum; cerebellar vermis; deep cerebellar nuclei; medial vestibular nucleus; neural layer of retina; decidua; dorsal tegmental nucleus; pontine nuclei; medial dorsal nucleus; stroma of bone marrow; More reference expression data
BioGPS	n/a
Gene ontology
Molecular function	transferase activity; nucleotide binding; protein binding; ATP binding; magnesium ion binding; kinase activity; ceramide kinase activity; NAD+ kinase activity; dihydroceramide kinase activity
Cellular component	cytoplasm; integral component of membrane; plasma membrane; membrane; mitochondrion
Biological process	glycosphingolipid metabolic process; ceramide metabolic process; phosphorylation; lipid phosphorylation; metabolism
Sources:Amigo / QuickGO
Orthologs
Databases	NCBI: entry; OMA: entry
Species	Human	Mouse
Entrez	64781	223753
Ensembl	ENSG00000100422	ENSMUSG00000035891
UniProt	Q8TCT0	Q8K4Q7
RefSeq (mRNA)	NM_022766; NM_182661	NM_145475
RefSeq (protein)	NP_073603; NP_073603.2	NP_663450
Location (UCSC)	Chr 22: 46.68 – 46.74 Mb	Chr 15: 86.14 – 86.19 Mb
PubMed search
- Wikidata
View/Edit Human	View/Edit Mouse

CERK is encoded by the CERK gene. The CERK gene is located on human chromosome 22q13, contains 13 exons, and is approximately 4.5kb in length. CERK shares sequence homology with sphingosine kinase type I, including an N-terminal pleckstrin homology (PH) domain and a diacylglycerol kinase domain. BLAST searches of expressed sequence tag (ESTs) by Sugiura and colleagues have yielded results showing orthologous CERK genes in other eukaryotes including Drosophila melanogaster, Caenorhabditis elegans, and Oryza sativa. A mouse homolog has been cloned as well.

The complete gene of human CERK contains 4459bp, which consists of a 123bp-5’-untranslated region, a 2772bp 3’-non-coding, and a 1611bp open reading frame. Sequence analysis of CERK putatively suggests that the following post-translational modification sites exist: 4 N-glycosylation sites, 15 phosphorylation sites, 5 prenylation sites, and 2 amidation sites. The complete gene of mouse CERK differed slightly, containing a 1593bp open reading frame. The decreased length of the open reading frame results in the loss of 2 prenylation sites and 1 amidation site.

In human CERK, a retinoic acid response element (RARE)-like exists between -40bp and -28bp and contains the sequence: TCCCCG C CGCCCG. RARE-like plays a role in transcription regulation of CERK. It is suspected that in the presence of all-trans retinoic acid (ATRA), chicken ovalbumin upstream promoter transcription factor I (COUP-TFI), retinoic acid receptor (RAR_{α}), retinoid X receptor (RXR_{α}) bind the RARE-like of CERK in 5H-SY5Y cells. However, CERK expression varies per cell line. In contrast to SH-SY5Y neuroblastoma cells, HL60 leukemia cells demonstrated no binding of CERK even in the presence of ATRA. This suggests that differential expression of RAR_{α}, RXR_{α}, and COUP-PTI may determine transcription levels in various cell lines.

== Protein ==
CERK is a 537 amino acid enzyme in humans (531 in mice). CERK was first discovered in 1989 when it was co-purified with synaptic vesicles from brain cells. Upon discovery, CERK was proposed to be a ceramide kinase that functions in the presence of μM concentration of calcium anions. Since CERK lacks a calcium binding site, the regulatory mechanism of CERK was poorly understood. CERK was later confirmed to bind calmodulin in the presence of calcium, indicating the calmodulin first binds calcium and then CERK. Once bound, CERK becomes active and is capable of phosphorylating ceramides. Binding of calmodulin occurs between amino acids 420 and 437 in CERK at a putative 1-8-14B calmodulin binding motif. The binding motif in CERK contains leu-422, phe-429, and leu-435 which respectively correspond to the 1st, 8th, and 14th hydrophobic amino acids where calmodulin binds. Mutation of Phe-429 results in weak calmodulin binding, while mutations of Phe-331 or Phe-335 entirely preclude binding.

CERK activity has primarily been observed within human neutrophils, cerebrum granule cells, and epithelium-derived lung cells. When inactive, CERK is suspended within the cytosol of the cell. When CERK is activated by interleukin-1β, it is localized to the trans-golgi, and from there, possibly delivered to the plasma membrane. Activation may also to cause CERK to localize within endosomes. CERK's PH domain plays an integral role in this localization. Once localized, to the trans-golgi CERK activates cytosolic phospholipase A2 (cPLA_{2}) that has localized to the trans-golgi. Activation of cPLA_{2} results in hydrolysis of membrane phospholipids to produce arachidonic acid. Ceramide kinase has also been demonstrated to regulate localization and level of phosphatidylinositol 4,5-bisphosphate (PIP2) produced from NORPA, a phospholipase C homolog in Drosophila melanogaster. In addition to endosomal and trans-golgi localization, CERK has been found to localize to outer mitochondrial membrane at the site of COX-2 localization in A549 cells.

== Ceramide-1-phosphate ==
As a lipid kinase CERK is responsible for the phosphorylation of ceramides. CERK is capable of phosphorylating multiple ceramide species. Though CERK will phosphorylate C2, C20, C22, and C24 ceramides, substrate specificity is quite poor. By contrast, CERK has the greatest substrate specificity for C6, C8, and C16 ceramides, indicating that the location of the sphingosine group plays a role in specificity. Dihydroceramide can also be phosphorylated by CERK, but to a lesser extent. In contrast to C6 ceramide, CERK has low specificity for C6 dihydroceramide, but retains high specificity for C8 dihydroceramide- Ceramide transport proteins (CERTs) transport ceramides to CERK for phosphorylation. Phosphorylation of ceramides to produce ceramide-1-phosphate (C-1-P) is believed to facilitate the localization of cPLA2 to the trans-golgi so that CERK can activate cPLA2.

== Functions in molecular biology ==
=== Cell survival and proliferation ===
Production of C-1-P bolsters cell survival and proliferation. It has been shown that C-1-P promotes DNA synthesis in fibroblasts. C-1-P also prevents apoptosis by inhibiting the caspase-9/caspase-3 pathway and preventing DNA fragmentation in macrophages. This is thought to occur via C-1-P interacting with and blocking functionality of acid sphingomyelinase. This results in diminished ceramide production, which precludes apoptosis. Recently, phosphorylation of ceramide via CERK has been shown to stimulate myoblast proliferation. It was demonstrated that C-1-P perpetuates the phosphorylation of glycogen synthase kinase-3 β and retinoblastoma protein, which contributes to transition from the G1 phase to M phase of the cell cycle. Additionally, production of C-1-P appears to result in increased expression of Cyclin D. CERK has demonstrated an ability to activate phosphatidylinositol 3-kinase/Akt (PI3K/Akt), ERK1/2, and mTOR. CERKs ability to produce signaling molecules that facilitate the activation of cell proliferation as well as its interaction with PI3K/Akt, and mTOR indicate that disregulated CERK expression may lead to cancer. In Drosophila, Dasgupta et al. reported in 2009 that CerK increases proapoptotic ceramide activity, which, in turn, promotes photoreceptor cell apoptotic turnover.

=== Other roles ===
In addition to cell survival and proliferation, CERK has been implicated in many other processes. CERK is believed to participate in altering the lipid raft structure via C-1-P production, contributing to phagosome formation in polymorphonuclear leukocytes. CERK has also been found to participate in the calcium-dependent degranulation of mast cells.
