= Dihydrosphingosine =

Dihydrosphingosine may refer to one of two isomeric chemical compounds:

- Safingol (threo-dihydrosphingosine)
- Sphinganine (erythro-dihydrosphingosine)
