= Sphingosine kinase 1 =

Protein-coding gene in the species Homo sapiens

SPHK1

Identifiers
- Aliases: SPHK1, SPHK, sphingosine kinase 1, SK1
- External IDs: OMIM: 603730; MGI: 1316649; GeneCards: SPHK1
Available structures
PDB	Ortholog search: PDBe RCSB
PDB	List of PDB id codes 3VZB, 3VZC, 3VZD, 4L02, 4V24
Enzyme activity
EC #	BRENDA	ExPASy	KEGG	MetaCyc
2.7.1.91	↗	↗	↗	↗

Gene location (Human)
Chr.	Chromosome 17 (human)
Band	17q25.1	Start	76,376,584 bp
Band	17q25.1	End	76,387,860 bp

Gene location (Mouse)
Chr.	Chromosome 11 (mouse)
Band	11|11 E2	Start	116,421,751 bp
Band	11|11 E2	End	116,427,501 bp
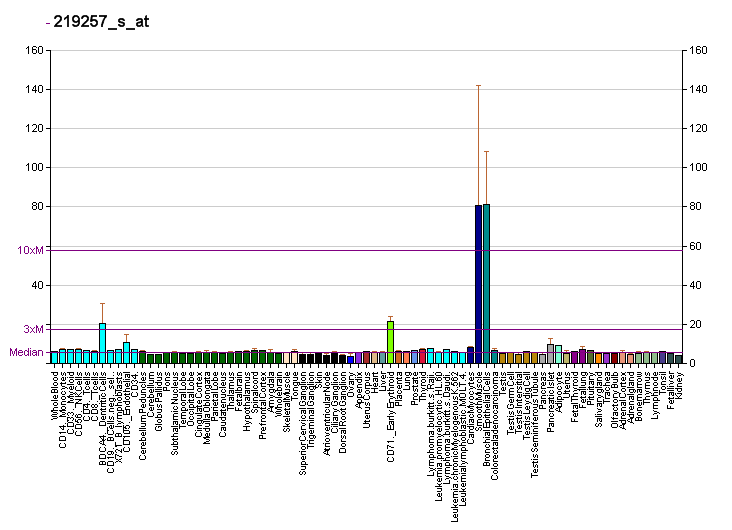
RNA expression pattern
Bgee	Human / Mouse (ortholog); Top expressed in: stromal cell of endometrium; tibial nerve; sural nerve; decidua; minor salivary glands; gastric mucosa; monocyte; upper lobe of left lung; right lung; left uterine tube / Top expressed in: gastrula; decidua; skin of external ear; lip; saccule; fetal liver hematopoietic progenitor cell; stroma of bone marrow; left lung lobe; tibiofemoral joint; otic vesicle; More reference expression data
BioGPS	More reference expression data
Gene ontology
Molecular function	sphingosine-1-phosphate receptor activity; transferase activity; nucleotide binding; DNA binding; calmodulin binding; kinase activity; protein binding; protein phosphatase 2A binding; ATP binding; magnesium ion binding; sphinganine kinase activity; D-erythro-sphingosine kinase activity; NAD+ kinase activity; lipid binding; acetyltransferase activity
Cellular component	cytoplasm; membrane; plasma membrane; nucleus; cytosol; clathrin-coated pit; endocytic vesicle; early endosome membrane; presynapse; endosome; endosome membrane; cell junction; synapse
Biological process	intracellular signal transduction; positive regulation of fibroblast proliferation; sphingosine metabolic process; regulation of tumor necrosis factor-mediated signaling pathway; sphingosine biosynthetic process; positive regulation of mitotic cell cycle; sphingolipid biosynthetic process; positive regulation of angiogenesis; positive regulation of cell growth; brain development; blood vessel development; positive regulation of NF-kappaB transcription factor activity; positive regulation of peptidyl-threonine phosphorylation; protein folding; positive regulation of cell population proliferation; regulation of interleukin-1 beta production; inflammatory response; sphingoid catabolic process; positive regulation of protein ubiquitination; positive regulation of smooth muscle contraction; calcium-mediated signaling; signal transduction; sphingosine-1-phosphate receptor signaling pathway; lipid phosphorylation; positive regulation of cell migration; negative regulation of apoptotic process; phosphorylation; metabolism; positive regulation of NIK/NF-kappaB signaling; positive regulation of mitotic nuclear division; cellular response to hydrogen peroxide; DNA biosynthetic process; sphingolipid mediated signaling pathway; protein acetylation; regulation of endocytosis; positive regulation of interleukin-17 production; response to tumor necrosis factor; cellular response to vascular endothelial growth factor stimulus; regulation of phagocytosis; regulation of neuroinflammatory response; negative regulation of ceramide biosynthetic process; positive regulation of p38MAPK cascade; regulation of microglial cell activation; regulation of endosomal vesicle fusion
Sources:Amigo / QuickGO
Orthologs
Databases	NCBI: entry; OMA: entry
Species	Human	Mouse
Entrez	8877	20698
Ensembl	ENSG00000176170	ENSMUSG00000061878
UniProt	Q9NYA1	Q8CI15
RefSeq (mRNA)	NM_001142601; NM_001142602; NM_021972; NM_182965; NM_001355139	NM_001172472; NM_001172473; NM_001172475; NM_011451; NM_025367 NM_001372484; NM_001372485; NM_001372486; NM_001372487; NM_001372488; NM_001372489
RefSeq (protein)	NP_001136073; NP_001136074; NP_068807; NP_892010; NP_001342068	NP_001165943; NP_001165944; NP_001165946; NP_079643; NP_001359413 NP_001359414; NP_001359415; NP_001359416; NP_001359417; NP_001359418
Location (UCSC)	Chr 17: 76.38 – 76.39 Mb	Chr 11: 116.42 – 116.43 Mb
PubMed search
- Wikidata
View/Edit Human	View/Edit Mouse

Sphingosine kinase 1 is an enzyme that in humans is encoded by the SPHK1 gene.

Sphingosine kinase 1 phosphorylates sphingosine to sphingosine-1-phosphate (S1P). SK1 is normally a cytosolic protein but is recruited to membranes rich in phosphatidate (PA), a product of phospholipase D (PLD).

Sphingosine-1-phosphate (S1P) is a novel lipid messenger with both intracellular and extracellular functions. Intracellularly, it regulates proliferation and survival, and extracellularly, it is a ligand for EDG1. Various stimuli increase cellular levels of S1P by activation of sphingosine kinase (SPHK), the enzyme that catalyzes the phosphorylation of sphingosine. Competitive inhibitors of SPHK block formation of S1P and selectively inhibit cellular proliferation induced by a variety of factors, including platelet-derived growth factor and serum.

== Interactions ==
SPHK1 has been shown to interact with TRAF2.
