= C20H41NO2 =

The molecular formula C_{20}H_{41}NO_{2} (molar mass : 327.553 g/mol) may refer to:

- N,N-Dimethylsphingosine
- Cetyl-GABA
