= CYM50308 =

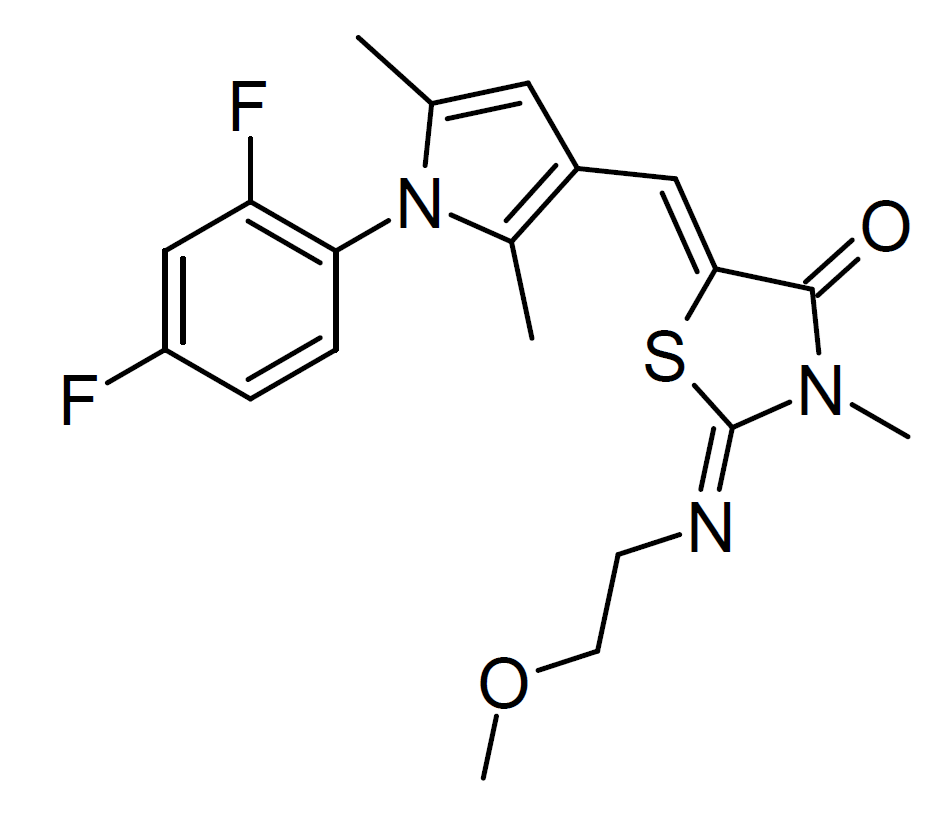

Clinical data
- ATC code: none

Identifiers
- IUPAC name: (5Z)-5-[[1-(2,4-difluorophenyl)-2,5-dimethylpyrrol-3-yl]methylidene]]-2-(2-methoxyethylimino)-3-methyl-1,3-thiazolidin-4-one
- CAS Number: 1345858-76-5
- PubChem CID: 49835928
- IUPHAR/BPS: 10311
- ChemSpider: 68023129
- ChEMBL: ChEMBL1910803

Chemical and physical data
- Formula: C_{20}H_{21}F_{2}N_{3}O_{2}S
- Molar mass: 405.46 g·mol^{−1}
- 3D model (JSmol): Interactive image
- SMILES: COCC\N=C1/S\C(=C/c2cc(C)n(c3ccc(F)cc3F)c2C)C(=O)N1C
- InChI: InChI=1S/C20H21F2N3O2S/c1-12-9-14(13(2)25(12)17-6-5-15(21)11-16(17)22)10-18-19(26)24(3)20(28-18)23-7-8-27-4/h5-6,9-11H,7-8H2,1-4H3/b18-10-,23-20?; Key:BKQZKTRCUAWRHT-ONBPWHQPSA-N

CYM50308 (ML248) is a drug which acts as a selective agonist at the sphingosine-1-phosphate receptor S1PR4. It is used for research into the structure and function of the S1PR4 receptor, and has demonstrated potential applications for S1PR4 agonists in the treatment of asthma.
