= Ceramidase =

Type of enzyme

Identifiers
- EC no.: 3.5.1.23
- CAS no.: 37289-06-8

Databases
- IntEnz: IntEnz view
- BRENDA: BRENDA entry
- ExPASy: NiceZyme view
- KEGG: KEGG entry
- MetaCyc: metabolic pathway
- PRIAM: profile
- PDB structures: RCSB PDB PDBe PDBsum
Search
- PMC: articles
- PubMed: articles
- NCBI: proteins

Ceramidase (EC 3.5.1.23, acylsphingosine deacylase, glycosphingolipid ceramide deacylase) is an enzyme which cleaves fatty acids from ceramide, producing sphingosine (SPH) which in turn is phosphorylated by a sphingosine kinase to form sphingosine-1-phosphate (S1P).

== Function ==
Ceramide, SPH, and S1P are bioactive lipids that mediate cell proliferation, differentiation, apoptosis, adhesion, and migration. Presently, 7 human ceramidases encoded by 7 distinct genes have been cloned:

- acid ceramidase (ASAH1) – cell survival
- neutral ceramidase (ASAH2, ASAH2B, ASAH2C) – protective against inflammatory cytokines
- alkaline ceramidase 1 (ACER1) – mediating cell differentiation by controlling the generation of SPH and S1P
- alkaline ceramidase 2 (ACER2) – important for cell proliferation and survival
- alkaline ceramidase 3 (ACER3)

== Clinical significance ==
A deficiency in ASAH1 is associated with Farber disease.

Human neutral ceramidase (nCDase) is an enzyme that plays a critical role in colon cancer and there are currently no potent or clinically effective inhibitors for nCDase reported to date. Inhibitors of nCDase were identified via a high-throughput screening effort of large chemical libraries at Scripps Research. Multiple rounds of chemical optimization ensued with improved potency in terms of IC50 and selectivity over counterscreen assays. The crystal structure of nCDase has been solved and these leads are now being pursued in crystal docking studies and in vitro drug metabolism and pharmacokinetics (DMPK).
