= Keystone Nano =

Keystone Nano, founded in 2005, is an American-based company headquartered in Pennsylvania, that creates nanoscale products to diagnose and treat human disease and improve the quality of life.

== History ==
Keystone Nano was founded in 2005 as a nanotechnology company developing nanoscale drug delivery systems. Early work is closely tied to academic research at Pennsylvania State University, where original technologies were developed.

Following the approval of its drug application in 2017, Keystone Nano initiated a Phase 1 clinical trial of its ceramide nanoliposome therapy to evaluate safety and dosing in patients with solid tumors. The same year, the therapy received designation from the U.S. Food and Drug Administration for the treatment of liver cancer, and was recognized in the continued development of treatments for rare diseases.

== Patents ==
Keystone Nano Inc. and team has been granted the follow patents:

- US Patent (8,747,891) - Awarded to The Penn State Research Foundation and Keystone Nano's Chief Medical Officer Mark Kester, this patent describes the process of loading Ceramide nano-scale liposomes with anti-cancer compounds and create a combination of therapies that benefit from the therapeutic activity of both Ceramide and the anti-cancer compound. This process improves the delivery of both compounds by targeting tumors and extending the time of biological activity.

== FDA Approval ==
In January 2017, the FDA approved the investigational new drug application, NanoLiposome, to assess the product as a form of treatment for solid tumors. Phase 1 trials will take place at the University of Maryland, University of Virginia, and the Medical University of South Carolina.

== Compound ==
Keystone was approved in 2017 to begin clinical trials to assess ceramide nanoliposome for possible use in treating cancer.
