= C19H31NO =

The molecular formula C_{19}H_{31}NO (molar mass: 289.46 g/mol) may refer to:

- SH-BC-893
- Bencyclane
