= ACER2 =

Ceramidase enzyme

Identifiers
- Aliases: ACER2, ALKCDase, ASAH3L, alkalina ceramidasa, ALKCDase2, alkaline ceramidase 2
- External IDs: OMIM: 613492; MGI: 1920932; GeneCards: ACER2
Enzyme activity
EC #	BRENDA	ExPASy	KEGG	MetaCyc
3.5.1.23	↗	↗	↗	↗

Gene location (Human)
Chr.	Chromosome 9 (human)
Band	9p22.1	Start	19,409,009 bp
Band	9p22.1	End	19,452,505 bp

Gene location (Mouse)
Chr.	Chromosome 4 (mouse)
Band	4|4 C4	Start	86,792,633 bp
Band	4|4 C4	End	86,853,059 bp
RNA expression pattern
Bgee	Human / Mouse (ortholog); Top expressed in: urinary bladder; gonad; placenta; subcutaneous adipose tissue; stomach; testicle; body of stomach; duodenum; body of pancreas; islet of Langerhans / Top expressed in: transitional epithelium of urinary bladder; right lung; right lung lobe; left lung; embryo; tail of embryo; genital tubercle; gastrula; atrium; left lung lobe; More reference expression data
BioGPS	n/a
Gene ontology
Molecular function	dihydroceramidase activity; hydrolase activity, acting on carbon-nitrogen (but not peptide) bonds, in linear amides; hydrolase activity; N-acylsphingosine amidohydrolase activity; ceramidase activity; metal ion binding
Cellular component	integral component of membrane; integral component of Golgi membrane; Golgi apparatus; membrane; Golgi membrane
Biological process	positive regulation of cell death; response to retinoic acid; ceramide metabolic process; lipid metabolism; sphingosine biosynthetic process; sphingolipid biosynthetic process; negative regulation of cell-matrix adhesion; positive regulation of cell population proliferation; activation of cysteine-type endopeptidase activity involved in apoptotic process; negative regulation of cell adhesion mediated by integrin; cellular response to DNA damage stimulus; regulation of autophagy; DNA damage response, signal transduction by p53 class mediator; regulation of apoptotic process; ceramide catabolic process; sphingolipid metabolic process
Sources:Amigo / QuickGO
Orthologs
Databases	NCBI: entry; OMA: entry
Species	Human	Mouse
Entrez	340485	230379
Ensembl	ENSG00000177076	ENSMUSG00000038007
UniProt	Q5QJU3	Q8VD53
RefSeq (mRNA)	NM_001010887	NM_001290541; NM_001290543; NM_139306; NM_028605
RefSeq (protein)	NP_001010887	NP_001277470; NP_001277472; NP_647467
Location (UCSC)	Chr 9: 19.41 – 19.45 Mb	Chr 4: 86.79 – 86.85 Mb
PubMed search
- Wikidata
View/Edit Human	View/Edit Mouse

Alkaline ceramidase 2 also known as ACER2 is a ceramidase enzyme which in humans is encoded by the ACER2 gene.

== Function ==
The ACER2/sphingosine pathway plays an important role in regulating integrin β1 subunit (ITGB1) maturation and cell adhesion mediated by β1 integrins.
