= Sphingomyelin deacylase =

Identifiers
- EC no.: 3.5.1.109

Databases
- IntEnz: IntEnz view
- BRENDA: BRENDA entry
- ExPASy: NiceZyme view
- KEGG: KEGG entry
- MetaCyc: metabolic pathway
- PRIAM: profile
- PDB structures: RCSB PDB PDBe PDBsum
Search
- PMC: articles
- PubMed: articles
- NCBI: proteins

Sphingomyelin deacylase (EC 3.5.1.109, SM deacylase, GcSM deacylase, glucosylceramide sphingomyelin deacylase, sphingomyelin glucosylceramide deacylase, SM glucosylceramide GCer deacylase, SM-GCer deacylase, SMGCer deacylase) is an enzyme with systematic name N-acyl-sphingosylphosphorylcholine amidohydrolase. This enzyme catalyses the following chemical reaction

(1) an N-acyl-sphingosylphosphorylcholine + H_{2}O $\rightleftharpoons$ a fatty acid + sphingosylphosphorylcholine;
(2) a D-glucosyl-N-acylsphingosine + H_{2}O $\rightleftharpoons$ a fatty acid + D-glucosyl-sphingosine

The enzyme is involved in the sphingolipid metabolism in the epidermis.
