= ASAH2B =

Protein-coding gene in the species Homo sapiens

Identifiers
- Aliases: ASAH2B, ASAH2L, bA449O16.3, bA98I6.3, N-acylsphingosine amidohydrolase (non-lysosomal ceramidase) 2B, ASAH2C, N-acylsphingosine amidohydrolase 2B
- External IDs: GeneCards: ASAH2B; OMA:ASAH2B - orthologs

Gene location (Human)
Chr.	Chromosome 10 (human)
Band	10q11.23	Start	50,739,318 bp
Band	10q11.23	End	50,816,495 bp
RNA expression pattern
Bgee	Human / Mouse (ortholog); Top expressed in: duodenum; gonad; islet of Langerhans; ganglionic eminence; testicle; superior frontal gyrus; liver; primary visual cortex; rectum; ventricular zone / n/a; More reference expression data
BioGPS	n/a
Gene ontology
Molecular function	N-acylsphingosine amidohydrolase activity
Cellular component	extracellular region
Biological process	long-chain fatty acid biosynthetic process; sphingosine biosynthetic process; ceramide catabolic process
Sources:Amigo / QuickGO
Orthologs
Species	Human	Mouse
Entrez	653308	n/a
Ensembl	ENSG00000204147	n/a
UniProt	P0C7U1	n/a
RefSeq (mRNA)	NM_001079516; NM_001321957; NM_001321958; NM_001321959; NM_001321960	n/a
RefSeq (protein)	NP_001072984; NP_001308886; NP_001308887; NP_001308888; NP_001308889	n/a
Location (UCSC)	Chr 10: 50.74 – 50.82 Mb	n/a
PubMed search		n/a
- Wikidata
View/Edit Human

Neutral ceramidase B also known as non-lysosomal ceramidase B or N-acylsphingosine amidohydrolase (non-lysosomal ceramidase) 2B or ASAH2B is a ceramidase enzyme which in humans is encoded by the ASAH2B gene.

== Clinical significance ==
ASAH2B shows reduced expression with increasing age and further reduction in late onset Alzheimer's disease patients.
