= Dihydroceramide desaturase =

Class of enzymes

Identifiers
- EC no.: 1.14.19.17

Databases
- IntEnz: IntEnz view
- BRENDA: BRENDA entry
- ExPASy: NiceZyme view
- KEGG: KEGG entry
- MetaCyc: metabolic pathway
- PRIAM: profile
- PDB structures: RCSB PDB PDBe PDBsum
Search
- PMC: articles
- PubMed: articles
- NCBI: proteins

Dihydroceramide desaturase is the enzyme involved in the conversion of dihydroceramide into ceramide by inserting the 4,5-trans-double bond to the sphingolipid backbone of dihydroceramide. DDase require the O_{2} and the NAD(P)H as cofactor.

The activity of DDase is influenced by several factors as

1. alkyl chain length of the sphingoid base (in the order C18 > C12 > C8) and fatty acid (C8 > C18)
2. The stereochemistry of the sphingoid base (D-erythro- > L-threo-dihydroceramides)
3. the nature of the headgroup, with the highest activity with dihydroceramide, but some (approximately 20%) activity with dihydrog lucosylceramide
4. The ability to utilize alternative reductants like ascorbic acid could substitute for a reduced pyridine nucleotide, but it act as inhibitory at higher concentrations.

N-[(1R,2S)-2-hydroxy-1-hydroxymethyl-2-(2-tridecyl-1-cyclopropenyl)ethyl]octanamide (GT11), is the inhibitor DDase activity.
