= ASAH2C =

Ceramidase enzyme

Identifiers
- Aliases
- External IDs: GeneCards: ; OMA:- orthologs
Orthologs
| Species | Human | Mouse |
| Entrez | 653365 | n/a |
| Ensembl | n/a | n/a |
| UniProt | n a | n/a |
| RefSeq (mRNA) | n/a | n/a |
| RefSeq (protein) | n/a | n/a |
| Location (UCSC) | n/a | n/a |
| PubMed search | | n/a |
- Wikidata
| View/Edit Human |

Neutral ceramidase C also known as N-acylsphingosine amidohydrolase 2C or non-lysosomal ceramidase C or ASAH2C is a ceramidase enzyme which in humans is encoded by the ASAH2C gene.
