= ACER3 =

Protein-coding gene in the species Homo sapiens

Identifiers
- Aliases: ACER3, APHC, PHCA, alkaline ceramidase 3, PLDECO
- External IDs: OMIM: 617036; MGI: 1913440; GeneCards: ACER3
Enzyme activity
EC #	BRENDA	ExPASy	KEGG	MetaCyc
3.5.1.23	↗	↗	↗	↗

Gene location (Human)
Chr.	Chromosome 11 (human)
Band	11q13.5	Start	76,860,859 bp
Band	11q13.5	End	77,026,797 bp

Gene location (Mouse)
Chr.	Chromosome 7 (mouse)
Band	7|7 E1	Start	98,206,389 bp
Band	7|7 E1	End	98,321,208 bp
RNA expression pattern
Bgee	Human / Mouse (ortholog); Top expressed in: endothelial cell; inferior ganglion of vagus nerve; mucosa of ileum; corpus callosum; pancreatic epithelial cell; pars reticulata; pars compacta; Brodmann area 46; subthalamic nucleus; buccal mucosa cell / Top expressed in: conjunctival fornix; cornea; interventricular septum; hair follicle; skin of external ear; sciatic nerve; decidua; skin of back; lobe of prostate; skin of abdomen; More reference expression data
BioGPS	n/a
Gene ontology
Molecular function	hydrolase activity, acting on carbon-nitrogen (but not peptide) bonds, in linear amides; hydrolase activity; phytoceramidase activity; N-acylsphingosine amidohydrolase activity; dihydroceramidase activity; ceramidase activity; calcium ion binding; zinc ion binding; metal ion binding
Cellular component	integral component of membrane; integral component of Golgi membrane; integral component of endoplasmic reticulum membrane; Golgi membrane; Golgi apparatus; endoplasmic reticulum membrane; endoplasmic reticulum; membrane
Biological process	sphingosine biosynthetic process; sphingolipid biosynthetic process; phytosphingosine biosynthetic process; ceramide metabolic process; positive regulation of cell population proliferation; inflammatory response; myelination; regulation of programmed cell death; ceramide catabolic process; lipid metabolism; sphingolipid metabolic process
Sources:Amigo / QuickGO
Orthologs
Databases	NCBI: entry; OMA: entry
Species	Human	Mouse
Entrez	55331	66190
Ensembl	ENSG00000078124	ENSMUSG00000030760
UniProt	Q9NUN7	Q9D099
RefSeq (mRNA)	NM_001300953; NM_001300954; NM_001300955; NM_018367	NM_025408
RefSeq (protein)	NP_001287882; NP_001287883; NP_001287884; NP_060837	NP_079684; NP_001347544; NP_001347545; NP_001347546
Location (UCSC)	Chr 11: 76.86 – 77.03 Mb	Chr 7: 98.21 – 98.32 Mb
PubMed search
- Wikidata
View/Edit Human	View/Edit Mouse

Alkaline ceramidase 3 also known as ACER3 is a ceramidase enzyme which in humans is encoded by the ACER3 gene.
