= SPHK2 =

Protein-coding gene in the species Homo sapiens

Identifiers
- Aliases: SPHK2, SK 2, SK-2, SPK 2, SPK-2, sphingosine kinase 2
- External IDs: OMIM: 607092; MGI: 1861380; GeneCards: SPHK2
Enzyme activity
EC #	BRENDA	ExPASy	KEGG	MetaCyc
2.7.1.91	↗	↗	↗	↗

Gene location (Human)
Chr.	Chromosome 19 (human)
Band	19q13.33	Start	48,619,291 bp
Band	19q13.33	End	48,630,717 bp

Gene location (Mouse)
Chr.	Chromosome 7 (mouse)
Band	7|7 B3	Start	45,358,891 bp
Band	7|7 B3	End	45,367,426 bp
RNA expression pattern
Bgee	Human / Mouse (ortholog); Top expressed in: mucosa of transverse colon; right frontal lobe; cingulate gyrus; anterior cingulate cortex; prefrontal cortex; C1 segment; right lobe of liver; right hemisphere of cerebellum; Brodmann area 9; mucosa of ileum / Top expressed in: saccule; otic placode; aortic valve; otic vesicle; granulocyte; lip; epithelium of stomach; duodenum; ascending aorta; crypt of lieberkuhn of small intestine; More reference expression data
BioGPS	n/a
Gene ontology
Molecular function	sphingosine-1-phosphate receptor activity; transferase activity; nucleotide binding; kinase activity; protein binding; ATP binding; D-erythro-sphingosine kinase activity; sphinganine kinase activity; NAD+ kinase activity
Cellular component	cytoplasm; lysosome; membrane; lysosomal membrane; cytosol; intracellular membrane-bounded organelle; nucleosome; nucleus; mitochondrion; mitochondrial inner membrane; endoplasmic reticulum
Biological process	phosphorylation; sphinganine-1-phosphate biosynthetic process; female pregnancy; sphingosine metabolic process; sphingosine biosynthetic process; negative regulation of apoptotic process; sphingolipid biosynthetic process; brain development; blood vessel development; positive regulation of cell population proliferation; cell population proliferation; lipid phosphorylation; sphingosine-1-phosphate receptor signaling pathway; metabolism; negative regulation of cell growth; negative regulation of histone deacetylation; positive regulation of mast cell activation involved in immune response; positive regulation of apoptotic process; regulation of I-kappaB kinase/NF-kappaB signaling; positive regulation of mast cell degranulation; histone H2A-K5 acetylation; histone H2B-K12 acetylation; epigenetic maintenance of chromatin in transcription-competent conformation; positive regulation of protein kinase C signaling; positive regulation of calcium ion import; negative regulation of histone deacetylase activity; regulation of reactive oxygen species biosynthetic process; cellular response to phorbol 13-acetate 12-myristate; regulation of cytochrome-c oxidase activity; positive regulation of ceramide biosynthetic process; positive regulation of histone H3-K9 acetylation; regulation of ATP biosynthetic process
Sources:Amigo / QuickGO
Orthologs
Databases	NCBI: entry; OMA: entry
Species	Human	Mouse
Entrez	56848	56632
Ensembl	ENSG00000063176	ENSMUSG00000057342
UniProt	Q9NRA0	Q9JIA7
RefSeq (mRNA)	NM_001204158; NM_001204159; NM_001204160; NM_001243876; NM_020126	NM_001172561; NM_020011; NM_203280
RefSeq (protein)	NP_001191087; NP_001191088; NP_001191089; NP_001230805; NP_064511	NP_001166032; NP_064395; NP_975009
Location (UCSC)	Chr 19: 48.62 – 48.63 Mb	Chr 7: 45.36 – 45.37 Mb
PubMed search
- Wikidata
View/Edit Human	View/Edit Mouse

Sphingosine kinase 2 is a protein that in humans is encoded by the SPHK2 gene.

This gene encodes one of two sphingosine kinase isozymes that catalyze the phosphorylation of sphingosine into sphingosine 1-phosphate. Sphingosine 1-phosphate mediates many cellular processes including migration, proliferation and apoptosis, and also plays a role in several types of cancer by promoting angiogenesis and tumorigenesis. The encoded protein may play a role in breast cancer proliferation and chemoresistance. Alternatively spliced transcript variants encoding multiple isoforms have been observed for this gene.

The researchers also found that the expression of sphingosine kinase 2 (SphK2) and the secretion of sphingosine-1-phosphate (S1P) were significantly upregulated in the lungs of CS-exposed mice with COPD-like symptoms.

== Inhibitors ==
- Opaganib
