= SH-BC-893 =

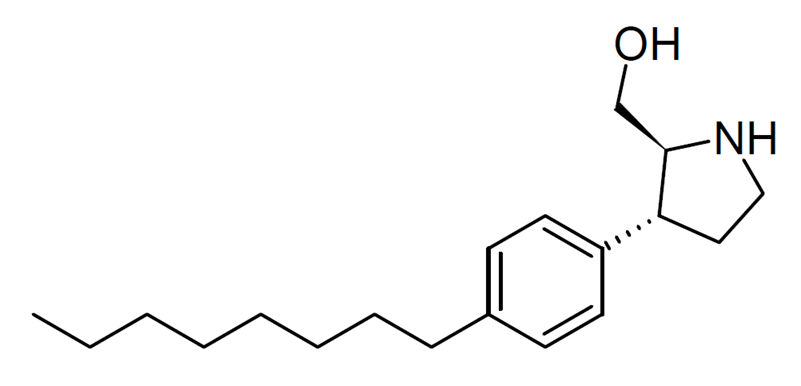

Identifiers
- IUPAC name: [(2S,3R)-3-(4-octylphenyl)pyrrolidin-2-yl]methanol
- CAS Number: 1841409-91-3
- PubChem CID: 126720664

Chemical and physical data
- Formula: C_{19}H_{31}NO
- Molar mass: 289.463 g·mol^{−1}
- 3D model (JSmol): Interactive image
- SMILES: CCCCCCCCC1=CC=C(C=C1)[C@H]2CCN[C@@H]2CO
- InChI: InChI=1S/C19H31NO/c1-2-3-4-5-6-7-8-16-9-11-17(12-10-16)18-13-14-20-19(18)15-21/h9-12,18-21H,2-8,13-15H2,1H3/t18-,19-/m1/s1; Key:FCFUUVQZYSWJLH-RTBURBONSA-N

SH-BC-893 is a synthetic sphingolipid derivative which has been researched for the treatment of cancer, and also shows broad-spectrum antiviral properties as well as potential application in the treatment of obesity. It acts by decreasing cell surface expression of several different nutrient transporter proteins, which can then starve cancer cells of nutrients as well as blocking viral entry into cells via endosomal pathways.

== See also ==
- Ceramide
