= Sphinganine =

Names
- IUPAC name Sphinganine
- Preferred IUPAC name Sphinganine
- Systematic IUPAC name (2S,3R)-2-Aminooctadecane-1,3-diol
- Other names: Dihydrospingosine; DL-erythro-Dihydrosphingosine; 2-Amino-1,3-dihydroxyoctadecane; [R-(R*,S*)]-2-aminooctadecane-1,3-diol

Identifiers
CAS Number	764-22-7
3D model (JSmol)	Interactive image
ChEBI	CHEBI:16566
ChEMBL	ChEMBL448741
ChemSpider	82609
DrugBank	DB11924
ECHA InfoCard	100.011.014
EC Number	212-116-0
IUPHAR/BPS	2453
KEGG	C00836
PubChem CID	91486
UNII	YT0ZSD64HM
CompTox Dashboard (EPA)	DTXSID501016568
- InChI: InChI=1S/C18H39NO2/c1-2-3-4-5-6-7-8-9-10-11-12-13-14-15-18(21)17(19)16-20/h17-18,20-21H,2-16,19H2,1H3/t17-,18+/m0/s1 Key: OTKJDMGTUTTYMP-ZWKOTPCHSA-N
- SMILES: C(CCCCCCCCCCCCCC)[C@H]([C@H](CO)N)O

Properties
Chemical formula	C_{18}H_{39}NO_{2}
Molar mass	301.515 g·mol^{−1}

Related compounds
Related sphingolipids	Sulfatide; Ceramide; Sphingosine; Phytosphingosine; Sphingosine-1-phosphate
Related compounds	Safingol
- Except where otherwise noted, data are given for materials in their standard state (at 25 °C [77 °F], 100 kPa). Infobox references

Sphinganine is a chemical compound of the sphingolipid class with molecular formula C_{18}H_{39}NO_{2}. Via the action of sphingosine kinase enzymes, it is converted to dihydrosphingosine 1-phosphate (sphinganine 1-phosphate), which has a variety of biological functions.

Sphinganine is one of many sphingoid bases (long-chain bases) besides sphingosine, which are backbones of sphingolipids. It is made by dehydrogenating 3-ketosphinganine, which is produced by condensation reaction of serine with palmitate. It is an intermediate in the biosynthesis of ceramide.

Sphinganine is a diastereomer of safingol.

== See also ==
- Sphingomonadaceae
- Serine C-palmitoyltransferase
