= 2-Hydroxyacylsphingosine 1-beta-galactosyltransferase =

Class of enzymes

2-hydroxyacylsphingosine 1-beta-galactosyltransferase

Identifiers
- EC no.: 2.4.1.45
- CAS no.: 37277-54-6

Databases
- IntEnz: IntEnz view
- BRENDA: BRENDA entry
- ExPASy: NiceZyme view
- KEGG: KEGG entry
- MetaCyc: metabolic pathway
- PRIAM: profile
- PDB structures: RCSB PDB PDBe PDBsum
- Gene Ontology: AmiGO / QuickGO
Search
- PMC: articles
- PubMed: articles
- NCBI: proteins

In enzymology, a 2-hydroxyacylsphingosine 1-beta-galactosyltransferase (EC 2.4.1.45) is an enzyme that catalyzes the chemical reaction

UDP-galactose + 2-(2-hydroxyacyl)sphingosine $\rightleftharpoons$ UDP + 1-(beta-D-galactosyl)-2-(2-hydroxyacyl)sphingosine

Thus, the two substrates of this enzyme are UDP-galactose and 2-(2-hydroxyacyl)sphingosine, whereas its two products are UDP and 1-(beta-D-galactosyl)-2-(2-hydroxyacyl)sphingosine.

This enzyme belongs to the family of glycosyltransferases, specifically the hexosyltransferases. The systematic name of this enzyme class is UDP-galactose:2-(2-hydroxyacyl)sphingosine 1-beta-D-galactosyl-transferase. Other names in common use include galactoceramide synthase, uridine diphosphogalactose-2-hydroxyacylsphingosine, galactosyltransferase, UDPgalactose-2-hydroxyacylsphingosine galactosyltransferase, UDP-galactose:ceramide galactosyltransferase, and UDP-galactose:2-2-hydroxyacylsphingosine galactosyltransferase.
