= Sphingosyl phosphatide =

Class of phospholipids

Sphingosyl phosphatide refers to a lipid containing phosphorus and a long-chain base.
