= Ammonium stearate =

Names
- IUPAC name azanium;octadecanoate
- Other names: Octadecanoic acid, ammonium salt (1:1); Stearic acid amine

Identifiers
CAS Number	1002-89-7
3D model (JSmol)	Interactive image
ChemSpider	55192
ECHA InfoCard	100.012.450
EC Number	213-695-2
PubChem CID	9861187
UNII	37899330TZ
CompTox Dashboard (EPA)	DTXSID0027353
- InChI: InChI=1S/C18H36O2.H3N/c1-2-3-4-5-6-7-8-9-10-11-12-13-14-15-16-17-18(19)20;/h2-17H2,1H3,(H,19,20);1H3 Key: JPNZKPRONVOMLL-UHFFFAOYSA-N
- SMILES: CCCCCCCCCCCCCCCCCC(=O)[O-].[NH4+]

Properties
Chemical formula	NH_{4}C_{18}H_{35}O_{2}
Molar mass	301.515 g·mol^{−1}
Appearance	Yellow-white powder
Density	0.89 g/cm^{3}
Melting point	22 °C (72 °F; 295 K)
Solubility in water	Slightly soluble
Solubility in benzene	Slightly soluble
Solubility in ethanol	Soluble
Solubility in methanol	Soluble

Hazards
- GHS labelling
Pictograms	(GHS07: Exclamation mark)
Signal word	Warning
Hazard statements	H319
Precautionary statements	P264, P280, P305+P351+P338
- Except where otherwise noted, data are given for materials in their standard state (at 25 °C [77 °F], 100 kPa). Infobox references

Ammonium stearate is a chemical compound with the chemical formula NH_{4}C_{18}H_{35}O_{2}.This is an organic ammonium salt of stearic acid.

== Synthesis ==
The compound can be prepared by reacting stearic acid and ammonium carbonate or ammonium hydroxide.

== Physical properties ==
When heated, ammonium stearate decomposes, releasing toxic fumes of NH_{3}.

== Uses ==
The compound is used to produce vanishing creams and waterproofing cements.
