= N,N-Dimethylsphingosine =

Names
- Preferred IUPAC name (2R,3S,4E)-2-(Dimethylamino)octadec-4-ene-1,3-diol
- Other names DMS, N,N-DMS

Identifiers
CAS Number	122314-67-4
3D model (JSmol)	Interactive image
ChEBI	CHEBI:78759
ChEMBL	ChEMBL447685
ChemSpider	4942657
IUPHAR/BPS	2454
PubChem CID	6438166
UNII	L9QRA71834
- InChI: InChI=1S/C20H41NO2/c1-4-5-6-7-8-9-10-11-12-13-14-15-16-17-20(23)19(18-22)21(2)3/h16-17,19-20,22-23H,4-15,18H2,1-3H3/b17-16+/t19-,20+/m1/s1 Key: YRXOQXUDKDCXME-QWKHPXNBSA-N; InChI=1/C20H41NO2/c1-4-5-6-7-8-9-10-11-12-13-14-15-16-17-20(23)19(18-22)21(2)3/h16-17,19-20,22-23H,4-15,18H2,1-3H3/b17-16+/t19-,20+/m1/s1 Key: YRXOQXUDKDCXME-QWKHPXNBBF
- SMILES: CCCCCCCCCCCCC/C=C/[C@@H]([C@@H](CO)N(C)C)O

Properties
Chemical formula	C_{20}H_{41}NO_{2}
Molar mass	327.553 g·mol^{−1}
- Except where otherwise noted, data are given for materials in their standard state (at 25 °C [77 °F], 100 kPa). verify (what is ?) Infobox references

N,N-Dimethylsphingosine (also known as DMS) is an inhibitor of sphingosine kinase.

In rats with neuropathic pain, the natural metabolite DMS is unregulated in the dorsal horn. Furthermore, DMS induces mechanical hypersensitivity when injected into rats.
