= Sphingosine kinase =

Class of enzymes

sphinganine kinase

Identifiers
- EC no.: 2.7.1.91
- CAS no.: 50864-48-7

Databases
- BRENDA: enzyme data
- ExPASy: NiceZyme view
- KEGG: enzyme entry
- MetaCyc: metabolic pathway
- Rhea: reactions
- PDB structures: RCSB PDB PDBe PDBsum
- Gene Ontology: AmiGO / QuickGO
Search
- PMC: articles
- PubMed: articles
- NCBI: proteins

sphingosine kinase 1
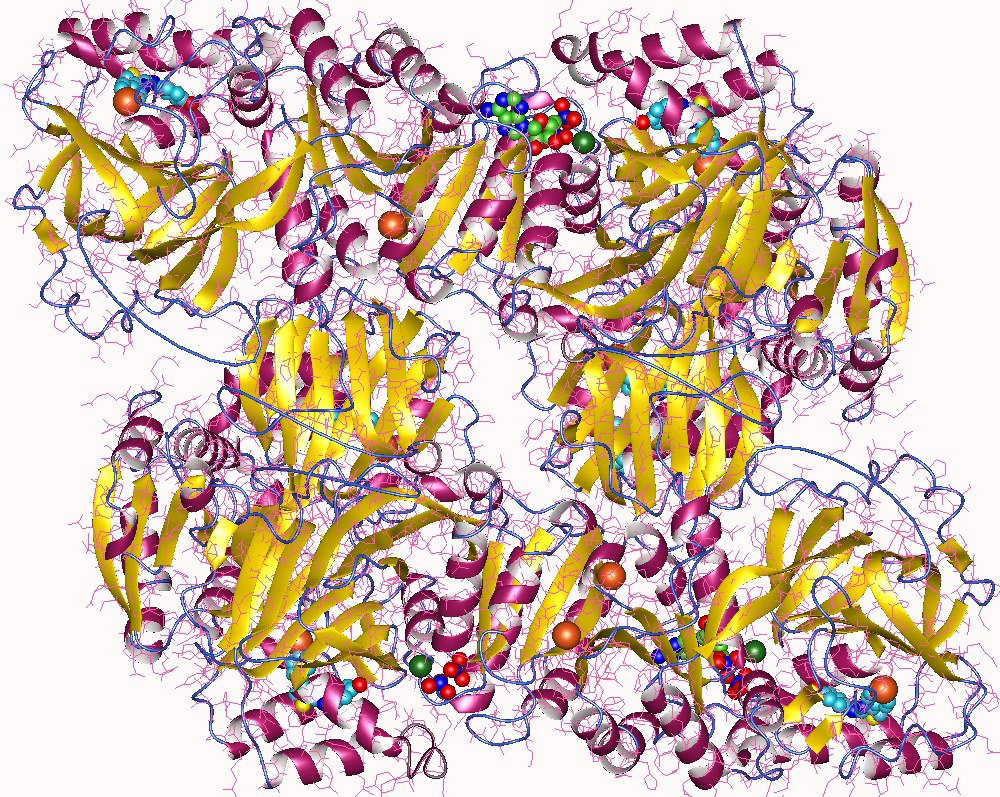
- Sphingosine kinase 1, hexamer, Human

Identifiers
- Symbol: SPHK1
- NCBI gene: 8877
- HGNC: 11240
- OMIM: 603730
- RefSeq: NM_182965
- UniProt: Q9NYA1

Other data
- EC number: 2.7.1.91
- Locus: Chr. 17 q25.2
Search for
- Structures: Swiss-model
- Domains: InterPro

sphingosine kinase 2

Identifiers
- Symbol: SPHK2
- NCBI gene: 56848
- HGNC: 18859
- OMIM: 607092
- RefSeq: NM_020126
- UniProt: Q9NRA0

Other data
- EC number: 2.7.1.91
- Locus: Chr. 19 q13.2
Search for
- Structures: Swiss-model
- Domains: InterPro

Sphingosine kinase (SphK) is a conserved lipid kinase that catalyzes formation sphingosine-1-phosphate (S1P) from the precursor sphingolipid sphingosine. Sphingolipid metabolites, such as ceramide, sphingosine and sphingosine-1-phosphate, are lipid second messengers involved in diverse cellular processes. There are two forms of SphK, SphK1 and SphK2. SphK1 is found in the cytosol of eukaryotic cells, and migrates to the plasma membrane upon activation. SphK2 is localized to the nucleus.

== Function ==
S1P has been shown to regulate diverse cellular processes. It has been characterized as a lipid signaling molecule with dual function. On one hand, it exerts its actions extracellularly by binding to the five different S1P receptors that couple to a variety of G-proteins to regulate diverse biological functions, ranging from cell growth and survival to effector functions, such as proinflammatory mediator synthesis. On the other hand, it appears to act as an intracellular second messenger, although the relevant molecular target(s) to which it binds within cells remains to be discovered. The role of S1P in various functions of cells and tissues is established, including regulation of cell survival and motility, angiogenesis, and inflammatory responses. Sphingosine kinases (SphKs) types 1 and 2, the two enzymes identified so far in mammals that produce S1P by ATP-dependent phosphorylation of sphingosine, have therefore received considerable interest.

== Sphingolipid metabolism ==
Sphingolipids are ubiquitous membrane constituents of all eukaryotic cells. In general, the term sphingolipid (SL) refers to any of a number of lipids consisting of a head group attached to the 1-OH of ceramide (Cer). Ceramides consist of a sphingoid base, commonly referred to as a long-chain base (LCB), which is N-acylated. De novo synthesis of LCBs begins with the condensation of palmitoyl-CoA with serine, forming 3-ketosphinganine (Fig. 1). This product is then reduced to sphinganine, also known as dihydrosphingosine (dihydro-Sph; 2-amino-1,3-dihydroxy-octadecane). A 14– to 26-carbon fatty acid chain is then added in an amide linkage with the 2-amino group, forming dihydroceramide (dihydro-Cer). A head group, such as phosphocholine or a carbohydrate, can now be added to the 1-OH, forming a sphingolipid, although most sphingolipids of higher eukaryotes contain further modifications of the LCB.

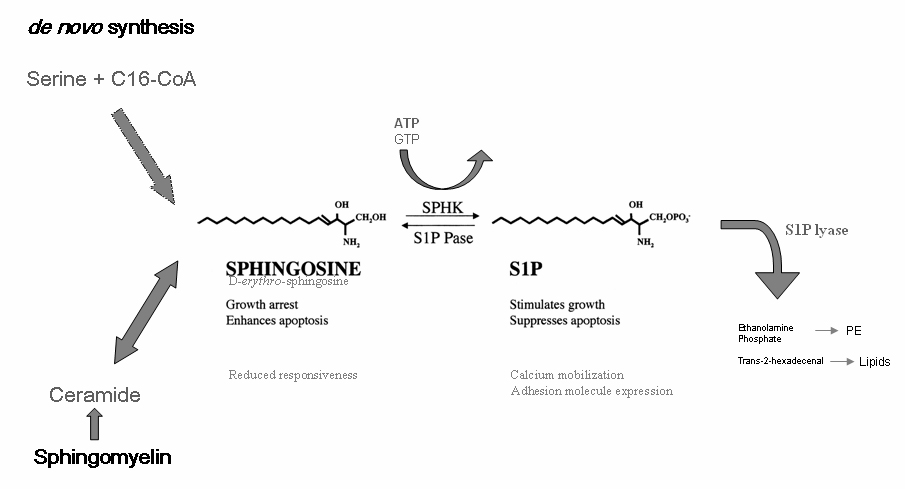
De novo synthesis

== Popular culture ==
During "100,000 Airplanes", a third season episode of The West Wing, sphingosine kinase is fictitiously described as "the enzyme believed to control all signal pathways to cancer growth." Learning of it inspires the protagonist of the series, President Josiah Bartlet, to consider launching an Apollo program to cure cancer.
