= Sphingosine-1-phosphate =

Signaling sphingolipid

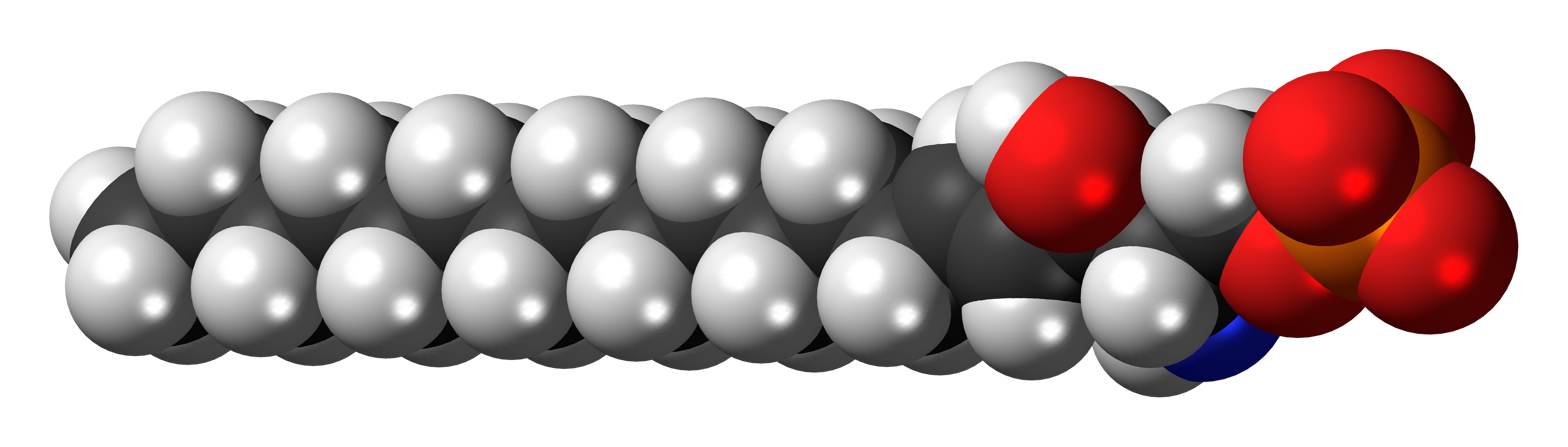

Names
- Preferred IUPAC name (2S,3R,4E)-2-Amino-3-hydroxyoctadec-4-en-1-yl dihydrogen phosphate

Identifiers
CAS Number	26993-30-6
3D model (JSmol)	Interactive image
ChEBI	CHEBI:37550
ChEMBL	ChEMBL225155
ChemSpider	4446673
ECHA InfoCard	100.164.436
IUPHAR/BPS	911
KEGG	C06124
MeSH	sphingosine+1-phosphate
PubChem CID	5283560
UNII	YVE187NJ1U
CompTox Dashboard (EPA)	DTXSID4037166
- InChI: InChI=1S/C18H38NO5P/c1-2-3-4-5-6-7-8-9-10-11-12-13-14-15-18(20)17(19)16-24-25(21,22)23/h14-15,17-18,20H,2-13,16,19H2,1H3,(H2,21,22,23)/b15-14+/t17-,18+/m0/s1 Key: DUYSYHSSBDVJSM-KRWOKUGFSA-N; InChI=1/C18H38NO5P/c1-2-3-4-5-6-7-8-9-10-11-12-13-14-15-18(20)17(19)16-24-25(21,22)23/h14-15,17-18,20H,2-13,16,19H2,1H3,(H2,21,22,23)/b15-14+/t17-,18+/m0/s1 Key: DUYSYHSSBDVJSM-KRWOKUGFBM
- SMILES: O=P(O)(OC[C@H](N)[C@H](O)/C=C/CCCCCCCCCCCCC)O

Properties
Chemical formula	C_{18}H_{38}NO_{5}P
Molar mass	379.472
- Except where otherwise noted, data are given for materials in their standard state (at 25 °C [77 °F], 100 kPa). verify (what is ?) Infobox references

Sphingosine-1-phosphate (S1P) is a signaling sphingolipid, also known as lysosphingolipid. It is also referred to as a bioactive lipid mediator. Sphingolipids at large form a class of lipids characterized by a particular aliphatic aminoalcohol, which is sphingosine.

== Production ==
S1P is formed from ceramide, which is composed of a sphingosine and a fatty acid. Ceramidase, an enzyme primarily present in plasma membrane, will convert ceramide to sphingosine. Sphingosine is then phosphorylated by sphingosine kinase (SK) isoenzymes. There are two identified mammalian isoenzymes: SK1 and SK2. These two enzymes have different tissue distribution. SK1 is highly expressed in spleen, lung and leukocytes, while SK2 is highly expressed in liver and kidney. SK2 is located mainly in the mitochondrion, nucleus and the endoplasmic reticulum, whereas SK1 is mainly located in cytoplasm and the cell membrane.

=== Metabolism and degradation ===
S1P can be dephosphorylated to sphingosine by sphingosine phosphatases and can be irreversibly degraded by an enzyme, sphingosine phosphate lyase.

== Function ==
S1P is a blood borne lipid mediator, in particular in association with lipoproteins such as high density lipoprotein (HDL). It is less abundant in tissue fluids. This is referred to as the S1P gradient, which seems to have biological significance in immune cell trafficking.

Originally thought as an intracellular second messenger, it was discovered to be an extracellular ligand for G protein-coupled receptor S1PR1 in 1998. It is now known that sphingosine-1-phosphate receptors (S1P receptors) are members of the lysophospholipid receptor family. There are five described to date. Most of the biological effects of S1P are mediated by signaling through the cell surface receptors.

Although S1P is of importance in the entire human body, it is a major regulator of vascular and immune systems, orchestrating how immune cells migrate within the arterial wall. In addition, it might be relevant in the skin. In the vascular system, S1P regulates angiogenesis, vascular stability, and permeability. In the immune system, it is now recognized as a major regulator of trafficking of T- and B-cells. S1P interaction with its receptor S1PR1 is needed for the egress of immune cells from the lymphoid organs (such as thymus and lymph nodes) into the lymphatic vessels. Inhibition of S1P receptors was shown to be critical for immunomodulation. S1P has also been shown to directly suppress TLR mediated immune response from T cells.

A research team, led by a scientist at Weill Cornell Medical College, has discovered that red blood cells perform a second vital function: angiogenesis. Given its role in creating new blood vessels, scientists recognize S1P as vital to human health — and a player in some diseases, such as cancer. And although S1P is known to be blood borne, no one realized until this study that S1P is supplied by red blood cells to control blood vessel growth.

== Clinical significance ==
The levels of S1P (in a range of 5–40 μmol/L) are 5 to 10 times up-regulated in ovarian cancer patients' ascites. S1P at this physiological concentration stimulates migration and invasion of epithelial ovarian cancer cells but inhibits migration of normal ovarian surface epithelial cells. Most (more than 90%) ovarian cancers arise from the epithelium of the ovary. Therefore, extracellular S1P could have an important role in cancer progression by promoting migration of epithelial ovarian cancer cells.

Ozonization of human blood is associated with increased concentrations of S1P in the plasma.

In addition, S1P modulates the proliferation of skin cells. This in particular applies to keratinocytes while fibroblasts are not addressed in this way, apart from cell growth and differentiation. While S1P suppresses epidermal proliferation as the glucocorticoids do, it differs from them in so far, as proliferation of dermal fibroblasts is not reduced. In fact, S1P even activates fibroblast-derived extracellular matrix protein production.

=== As a drug ===
Administration of S1P has been shown to protect oocytes from chemotherapeutic agents in vitro, as well as in vivo from chemotherapeutic and radiation therapies. which otherwise induce apoptosis of the cells. S1P has protected ovarian tissue xenografts in SCID mouse models from radiation induced atresia. In animal models these protected oocytes have been used to produce healthy live young. Radiotherapies and chemotherapies can cause apoptosis of ovarian follicles, causing premature ovarian failure, and so S1P is of great interest in fertility preservation. However, its mechanism of inhibiting the sphingomyelin apoptotic pathway may also interfere with the apoptosis action of chemotherapy drugs.

Due to the hyperproliferative action against epidermal cells, S1P has been considered as an active pharmaceutical ingredient for hyperproliferative skin diseases, in particular, psoriasis vulgaris and acne vulgaris.

Although S1P is active at very low concentrations, bioavailability of the compound in human skin is a concern. Therefore, a topical formulation based on specific drug carriers has been considered inevitable.

=== As a drug target ===
Lpath Inc has produced and optimized a monoclonal anti-S1P antibody (Sphingomab). Sphingomab can absorb S1P from the extracellular fluid, thereby lowering the effective concentration of S1P.

Sonepcizumab is an experimental anti-S1P monoclonal antibody that has had a phase II clinical trial for renal cell carcinoma. Sonepcizumab (LT1009) as ASONEP (for intravenous injection) has been studied for solid tumours. As iSONEP, a formulation for intravitreal injection, it has been studied for age-related macular degeneration.

=== S1P receptor(s) as a drug target ===
There are 5 types of Sphingosine-1-phosphate receptor.

==== S1P receptor modulators ====
The drug fingolimod (FTY720), which agonizes the S1P receptor, prevents autoimmune lymphocytes from moving from the lymphoid organs into the central nervous system. It has been shown in phase III clinical trials to reduce relapses and improve other outcomes in multiple sclerosis. S1P, as well as FTY720, has been shown to have anti-inflammatory properties at low concentrations and prevent monocyte:endothelial interactions in aorta, possibly through the S1P1 receptor. The S1P receptor agonist etrasimod has been shown to induce remission in patient with ulcerative colitis.

ONO-4641 (a drug of Ono Pharmaceutical Co., Ltd.) is a sphingosine-1-phosphate (S1P) receptor agonist which keeps lymphocytes in lymph nodes and thereby inhibits the infiltration of lymphocytes into lesions. The compound is therefore expected to be a drug for the treatment of auto-immune diseases such as multiple sclerosis, which is regarded as an intractable disease.

Ozanimod is an agonist of the S1P1 and S1P5 receptors. and has been studied for various forms of multiple sclerosis.

== See also ==
- Lipid signaling
- Lysophosphatidic acid
