= Sphingolipid =

Family of chemical compounds

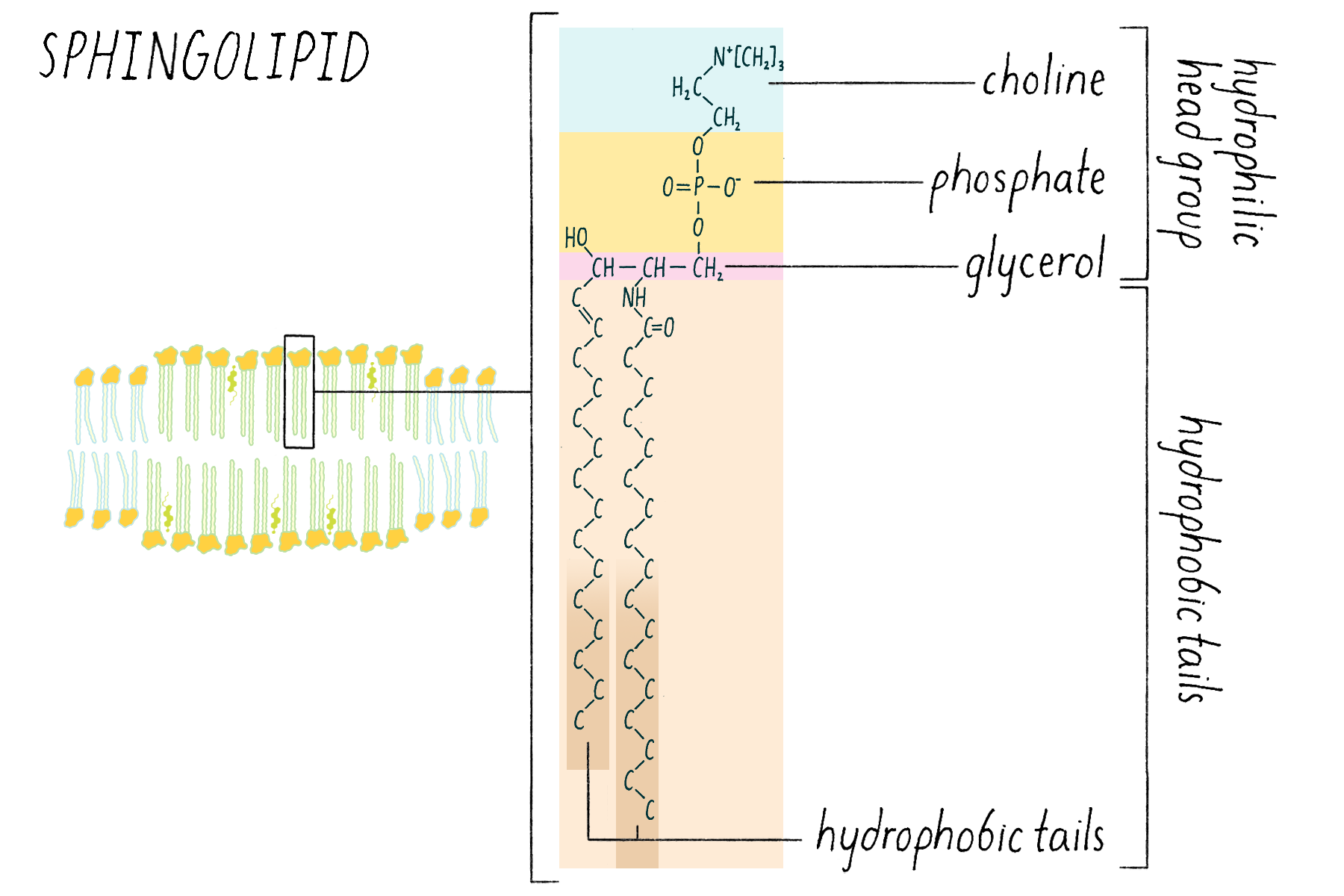
A type of lipid generally found on the outer layer of the plasma membrane; they increase membrane rigidity and make the membrane more resistant to mechanical or chemical disruption.

Sphingolipids are a class of lipids containing a backbone of sphingoid bases, which are a set of aliphatic amino alcohols that includes sphingosine. They were discovered in brain extracts in the 1870s and were named after the mythological sphinx because of their enigmatic nature. These compounds play important roles in signal transduction and cell recognition. Sphingolipidoses, or disorders of sphingolipid metabolism, have particular impact on neural tissue. A sphingolipid with a terminal hydroxyl group is a ceramide. Other common groups bonded to the terminal oxygen atom include phosphocholine, yielding a sphingomyelin, and various sugar monomers or dimers, yielding cerebrosides and globosides, respectively. Cerebrosides and globosides are collectively known as glycosphingolipids.

== Structure ==
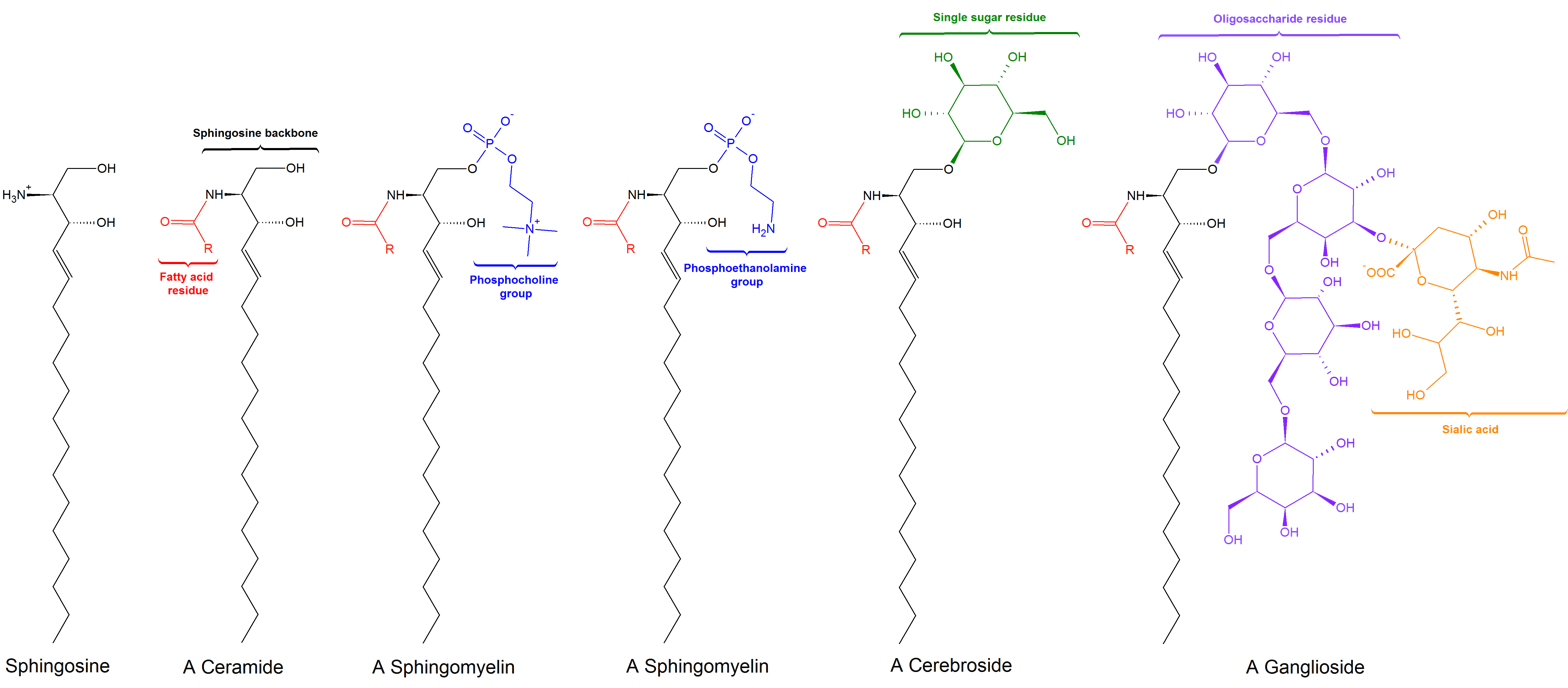
General structures of sphingolipids

The long-chain bases, sometimes simply known as sphingoid bases, are the first non-transient products of de novo sphingolipid synthesis in both yeast and mammals. These compounds, specifically known as phytosphingosine and dihydrosphingosine (also known as sphinganine, although this term is less common), are mainly C_{18} compounds, with somewhat lower levels of C_{20} bases. Ceramides and glycosphingolipids are N-acyl derivatives of these compounds.

The sphingosine backbone is O-linked to a (usually) charged head group such as ethanolamine, serine, or choline.

The backbone is also amide-linked to an acyl group, such as a fatty acid.

== Types ==
Simple sphingolipids, which include the sphingoid bases and ceramides, make up the early products of the sphingolipid synthetic pathways.

- Sphingoid bases are the fundamental building blocks of all sphingolipids. The main mammalian sphingoid bases are dihydrosphingosine and sphingosine, while dihydrosphingosine and phytosphingosine are the principal sphingoid bases in yeast. Sphingosine, dihydrosphingosine, and phytosphingosine may be phosphorylated.
- Ceramides, as a general class, are N-acylated sphingoid bases lacking additional head groups.
  - Dihydroceramide is produced by N-acylation of dihydrosphingosine. Dihydroceramide is found in both yeast and mammalian systems.
  - Ceramide is produced in mammalian systems by desaturation of dihydroceramide by dihydroceramide desaturase 1 (DES1). This highly bioactive molecule may also be phosphorylated to form ceramide-1-phosphate.
  - Phytoceramide is produced in yeast by hydroxylation of dihydroceramide at C-4.

Complex sphingolipids may be formed by addition of head groups to ceramide or phytoceramide:

- Sphingomyelins have a phosphocholine or phosphoethanolamine molecule with an ester linkage to the 1-hydroxy group of a ceramide.
- Glycosphingolipids are ceramides with one or more sugar residues joined in a β-glycosidic linkage at the 1-hydroxyl position (see image).
  - Cerebrosides have a single glucose or galactose at the 1-hydroxy position.
    - Sulfatides are sulfated cerebrosides.
  - Gangliosides have at least three sugars, one of which must be sialic acid.
- Inositol-containing ceramides, which are derived from phytoceramide, are produced in yeast. These include inositol phosphorylceramide, mannose inositol phosphorylceramide, and mannose diinositol phosphorylceramide.

== Mammalian sphingolipid metabolism ==
De novo sphingolipid synthesis begins with formation of 3-keto-dihydrosphingosine by serine palmitoyltransferase. The preferred substrates for this reaction are palmitoyl-CoA and serine. However, studies have demonstrated that serine palmitoyltransferase has some activity toward other species of fatty acyl-CoA and alternative amino acids, and the diversity of sphingoid bases has recently been reviewed. Next, 3-keto-dihydrosphingosine is reduced to form dihydrosphingosine. Dihydrosphingosine is acylated by one of six (dihydro)-ceramide synthase, CerS - originally termed LASS - to form dihydroceramide. The six CerS enzymes have different specificity for acyl-CoA substrates, resulting in the generation of dihydroceramides with differing chain lengths (ranging from C14-C26). Dihydroceramides are then desaturated to form ceramide.

Metabolic pathways of various forms of sphingolipids. Sphingolipidoses are labeled at corresponding stages that are deficient.

De novo generated ceramide is the central hub of the sphingolipid network and subsequently has several fates. It may be phosphorylated by ceramide kinase to form ceramide-1-phosphate. Alternatively, it may be glycosylated by glucosylceramide synthase or galactosylceramide synthase. Additionally, it can be converted to sphingomyelin by the addition of a phosphorylcholine headgroup by sphingomyelin synthase. Diacylglycerol is generated by this process. Finally, ceramide may be broken down by a ceramidase to form sphingosine. Sphingosine may be phosphorylated to form sphingosine-1-phosphate. This may be dephosphorylated to reform sphingosine.

Breakdown pathways allow the reversion of these metabolites to ceramide. The complex glycosphingolipids are hydrolyzed to glucosylceramide and galactosylceramide. These lipids are then hydrolyzed by beta-glucosidases and beta-galactosidases to regenerate ceramide. Similarly, sphingomyelin may be broken down by sphingomyelinase to form ceramide.

The only route by which sphingolipids are converted to non-sphingolipids is through sphingosine-1-phosphate lyase. This forms ethanolamine phosphate and hexadecenal.

== Functions of mammalian sphingolipids ==
Sphingolipids are commonly believed to protect the cell surface against harmful environmental factors by forming a mechanically stable and chemically resistant outer leaflet of the plasma membrane lipid bilayer. Certain complex glycosphingolipids were found to be involved in specific functions, such as cell recognition and signaling. Cell recognition depends mainly on the physical properties of the sphingolipids, whereas signaling involves specific interactions of the glycan structures of glycosphingolipids with similar lipids present on neighboring cells or with proteins.

Recently, simple sphingolipid metabolites, such as ceramide and sphingosine-1-phosphate, have been shown to be important mediators in the signaling cascades involved in apoptosis, proliferation, stress responses, necrosis, inflammation, autophagy, senescence, and differentiation. Ceramide-based lipids self-aggregate in cell membranes and form separate phases less fluid than the bulk phospholipids. These sphingolipid-based microdomains, or "lipid rafts" were originally proposed to sort membrane proteins along the cellular pathways of membrane transport. At present, most research focuses on the organizing function during signal transduction.

Sphingolipids are synthesized in a pathway that begins in the ER and is completed in the Golgi apparatus, but these lipids are enriched in the plasma membrane and in endosomes, where they perform many of their functions. Transport occurs via vesicles and monomeric transport in the cytosol. Sphingolipids are virtually absent from mitochondria and the ER, but constitute a 20-35 molar percentage of plasma membrane lipids.

In experimental animals, feeding sphingolipids inhibits colon carcinogenesis, reduces LDL cholesterol and elevates HDL cholesterol.

== Other sphingolipids ==
Sphingolipids are universal in eukaryotes but are rare in bacteria and archaea, meaning that they are evolutionally very old. Bacteria that do produce sphingolipids are found in some members of the superphylum FCB group (Sphingobacteria), particularly family Sphingomonadaceae, some members of the Bdellovibrionota, and some members of the Myxococcota.

=== Yeast sphingolipids ===
Because of the incredible complexity of mammalian systems, yeast are often used as a model organism for working out new pathways. These single-celled organisms are often more genetically tractable than mammalian cells, and strain libraries are available to supply strains harboring almost any non-lethal open reading frame single deletion. The two most commonly used yeasts are Saccharomyces cerevisiae and Schizosaccharomyces pombe, although research is also done in the pathogenic yeast Candida albicans.

In addition to the important structural functions of complex sphingolipids (inositol phosphorylceramide and its mannosylated derivatives), the sphingoid bases phytosphingosine and dihydrosphingosine (sphinganine) play vital signaling roles in S. cerevisiae. These effects include regulation of endocytosis, ubiquitin-dependent proteolysis (and, thus, regulation of nutrient uptake), cytoskeletal dynamics, the cell cycle, translation, posttranslational protein modification, and the heat stress response. Additionally, modulation of sphingolipid metabolism by phosphatidylinositol (4,5)-bisphosphate signaling via Slm1p and Slm2p and calcineurin has recently been described. Additionally, a substrate-level interaction has been shown between complex sphingolipid synthesis and cycling of phosphatidylinositol 4-phosphate by the phosphatidylinositol kinase Stt4p and the lipid phosphatase Sac1p.

=== Plant sphingolipids ===
Higher plants contain a wider variety of sphingolipids than animals and fungi.

== Disorders ==
There are several disorders of sphingolipid metabolism, known as sphingolipidoses. The main members of this group are Niemann-Pick disease, Fabry disease, Krabbe disease, Gaucher disease, Tay–Sachs disease and Metachromatic leukodystrophy. They are generally inherited in an autosomal recessive fashion, but notably Fabry disease is X-linked. Taken together, sphingolipidoses have an incidence of approximately 1 in 10,000, but substantially more in certain populations such as Ashkenazi Jews. Enzyme replacement therapy is available to treat mainly Fabry disease and Gaucher disease, and people with these types of sphingolipidoses may live well into adulthood. The other types are generally fatal by age 1 to 5 years for infantile forms, but progression may be mild for juvenile- or adult-onset forms.

Sphingolipids have also been implicated with the frataxin protein (Fxn), the deficiency of which is associated with Friedreich's ataxia (FRDA). Loss of Fxn in the nervous system in mice also activates an iron/sphingolipid/PDK1/Mef2 pathway, indicating that the mechanism is evolutionarily conserved. Furthermore, sphingolipid levels and PDK1 activity are also increased in hearts of FRDA patients, suggesting that a similar pathway is affected in FRDA. Other research has demonstrated that iron accumulation in the nervous systems of flies enhances the synthesis of sphingolipids, which in turn activates 3-phosphoinositide dependent protein kinase-1 (Pdk1) and myocyte enhancer factor-2 (Mef2) to trigger neurodegeneration of adult photoreceptors.

Sphingolipids play a key role in neuronal survival in Parkinson's Disease (PD) and their catabolic pathway alteration in the brain is partly represented in cerebrospinal fluid and blood tissues (Table1) and have the diagnostic potential.

== Additional images ==
Sphingosine

== See also ==
- Sphingosyl phosphatide
- SH-BC-893
