= Sphingosine =

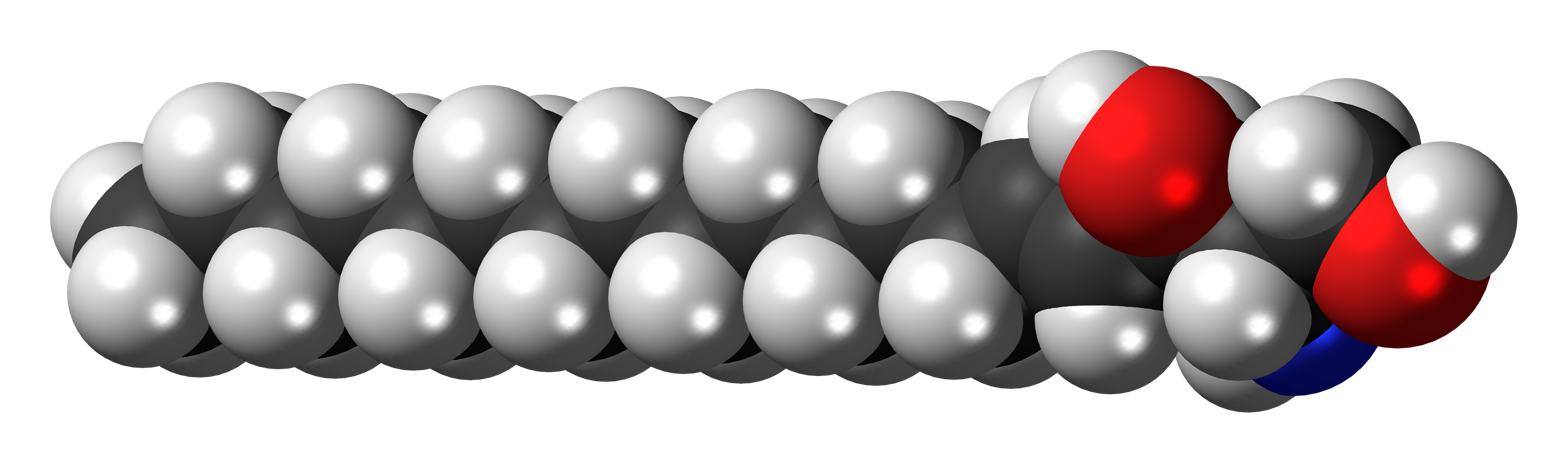

Names
- Preferred IUPAC name (2S,3R,4E)-2-Aminooctadec-4-ene-1,3-diol

Identifiers
CAS Number	123-78-4
3D model (JSmol)	Interactive image
ChEBI	CHEBI:16393
ChEMBL	ChEMBL67166
ChemSpider	4444047
ECHA InfoCard	100.004.230
IUPHAR/BPS	2452
PubChem CID	5280335
UNII	NGZ37HRE42
CompTox Dashboard (EPA)	DTXSID90861763
- InChI: InChI=1S/C18H37NO2/c1-2-3-4-5-6-7-8-9-10-11-12-13-14-15-18(21)17(19)16-20/h14-15,17-18,20-21H,2-13,16,19H2,1H3/b15-14+/t17-,18+/m0/s1 Key: WWUZIQQURGPMPG-KRWOKUGFSA-N; InChI=1/C18H37NO2/c1-2-3-4-5-6-7-8-9-10-11-12-13-14-15-18(21)17(19)16-20/h14-15,17-18,20-21H,2-13,16,19H2,1H3/b15-14+/t17-,18+/m0/s1 Key: WWUZIQQURGPMPG-KRWOKUGFBW
- SMILES: CCCCCCCCCCCCC/C=C/[C@H]([C@H](CO)N)O

Properties
Chemical formula	C_{18}H_{37}NO_{2}
Molar mass	299.499 g·mol^{−1}
- Except where otherwise noted, data are given for materials in their standard state (at 25 °C [77 °F], 100 kPa). verify (what is ?) Infobox references

Sphingosine (2-amino-4-trans-octadecene-1,3-diol) is an 18-carbon amino alcohol with an unsaturated hydrocarbon chain, which forms a primary part of sphingolipids, a class of cell membrane lipids that include sphingomyelin, an important phospholipid.

== Functions ==
Sphingosine can be phosphorylated in vivo via two kinases, sphingosine kinase type 1 and sphingosine kinase type 2. This leads to the formation of sphingosine-1-phosphate, a potent signaling lipid.

Sphingosine has been investigated for its potential anticancer effects, as it can promote apoptosis and influence signaling pathways involved in cell growth and survival. Sphingosine has also served as a structural template for synthetic analogs, such as fingolimod (FTY720), which modulates sphingosine-1-phosphate receptor signaling through its phosphorylated metabolite.

Sphingolipid metabolites, such as ceramides, sphingosine and sphingosine-1-phosphate, are lipid signaling molecules involved in diverse cellular processes.

== Biosynthesis ==
Sphingosine is synthesized from palmitoyl CoA and serine in a condensation required to yield sphinganine (dihydrosphingosine).

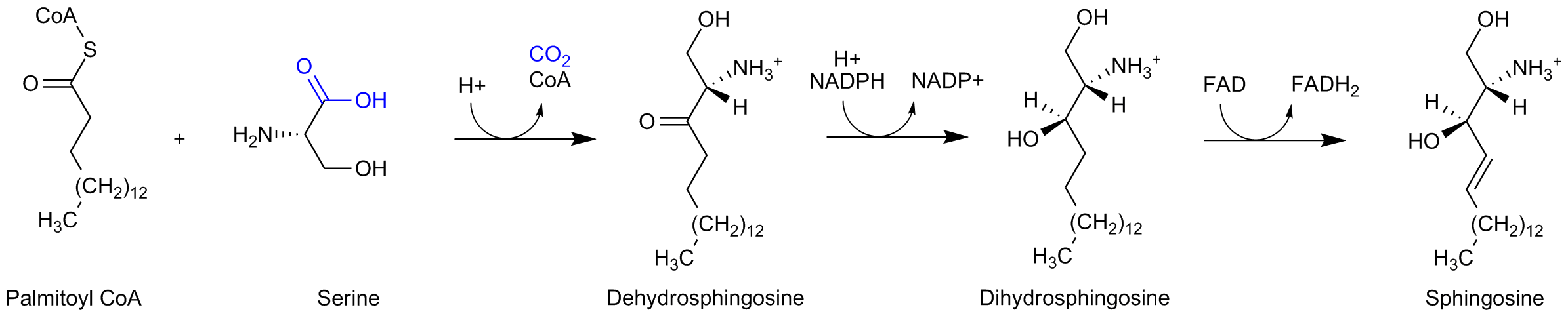

Dehydrosphingosine is then reduced by NADPH to sphinganine, acylated to dihydroceramide, and finally oxidized by FAD to ceramide. Sphingosine is then solely formed via degradation of sphingolipid in the lysosome.

== Gallery ==
Sphingolipidoses

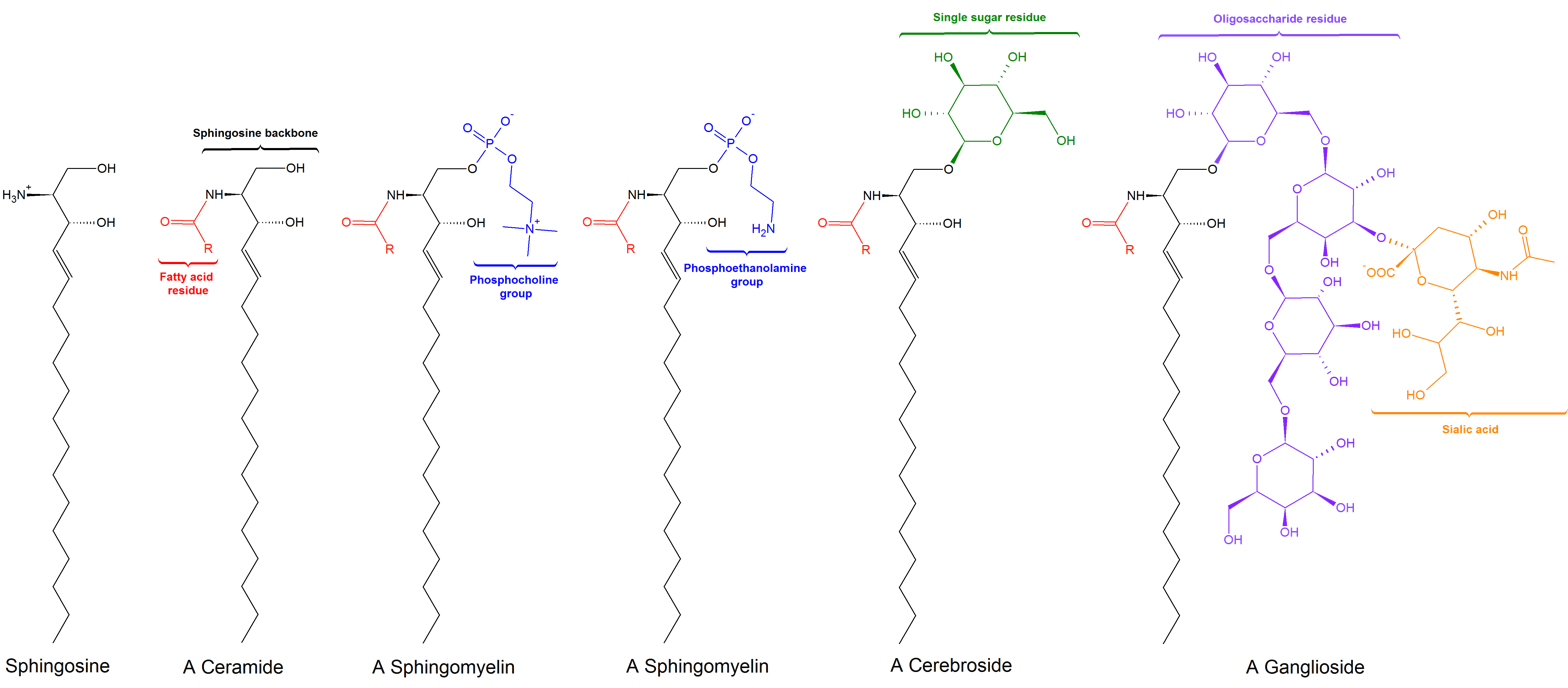
General structures of sphingolipids

== See also ==
- Dimethylsphingosine
- Fingolimod

== Literature ==
- Radin N (2003). "Killing tumours by ceramide-induced apoptosis: a critique of available drugs". Biochem J. 371 (Pt 2): 243–56. doi:10.1042/BJ20021878. PMC 1223313. PMID 12558497. article
- Carter, Herbert E.; Glick, Francis J.; Norris, William P.; Phillips, George E. (1947). "Biochemistry of the sphingolipides. III. Structure of sphingosine". J. Biol. Chem. 170 (1): 285–295. doi:10.1016/S0021-9258(17)34955-4.
