= Ceramide synthase 4 =

Protein-coding gene in the species Homo sapiens

CERS4

Identifiers
- Aliases: CERS4, LASS4, Trh1, ceramide synthase 4, Ceramide synthase 4 (CerS4)
- External IDs: OMIM: 615334; MGI: 1914510; GeneCards: CERS4
Enzyme activity
EC #	BRENDA	ExPASy	KEGG	MetaCyc
2.3.1.24	↗	↗	↗	↗

Gene location (Human)
Chr.	Chromosome 19 (human)
Band	19p13.2	Start	8,206,736 bp
Band	19p13.2	End	8,262,421 bp

Gene location (Mouse)
Chr.	Chromosome 8 (mouse)
Band	8|8 A1.1	Start	4,543,026 bp
Band	8|8 A1.1	End	4,581,680 bp
RNA expression pattern
Bgee	Human / Mouse (ortholog); Top expressed in: body of pancreas; right lobe of thyroid gland; left lobe of thyroid gland; right lobe of liver; C1 segment; minor salivary glands; ectocervix; skin of abdomen; skin of leg; sural nerve / Top expressed in: lip; skin of external ear; neural layer of retina; saccule; supraoptic nucleus; dorsomedial hypothalamic nucleus; median eminence; otic vesicle; interventricular septum; aortic valve; More reference expression data
BioGPS	n/a
Gene ontology
Molecular function	DNA binding; sphingosine N-acyltransferase activity
Cellular component	integral component of membrane; nuclear membrane; endoplasmic reticulum membrane; nucleus; membrane; endoplasmic reticulum
Biological process	ceramide biosynthetic process; sphingolipid biosynthetic process; lipid metabolism
Sources:Amigo / QuickGO
Orthologs
Databases	NCBI: entry; OMA: entry
Species	Human	Mouse
Entrez	79603	67260
Ensembl	ENSG00000090661	ENSMUSG00000008206
UniProt	Q9HA82	Q9D6J1
RefSeq (mRNA)	NM_024552	NM_026058
RefSeq (protein)	NP_078828	NP_080334
Location (UCSC)	Chr 19: 8.21 – 8.26 Mb	Chr 8: 4.54 – 4.58 Mb
PubMed search
- Wikidata
View/Edit Human	View/Edit Mouse

Ceramide synthase 4

Identifiers
- Symbol: CerS4
- Alt. symbols: LASS4
- NCBI gene: 79603
- HGNC: 23747
- OMIM: 615334
- RefSeq: NM_024552.2
- UniProt: Q9HA82

Other data
- EC number: 2.3.1.24
- Locus: Chr. 19 p13.3
Search for
- Structures: Swiss-model
- Domains: InterPro

Ceramide synthase 4 (CerS4) is an enzyme that in humans is encoded by the CERS4 gene and is one of the least studied of the ceramide synthases.

== Function and distribution ==
CerS4 synthesizes ceramides containing C18-22 fatty acids in a fumonisin B1-independent manner. It is expressed at highest levels in skin, leukocytes, heart and liver, although at much lower levels than other ceramide synthases.

== Tissue and cellular distribution ==
CerS4 (TRH1) mRNA was found in all tissues and is strongly expressed in skin and muscle

== Clinical significance ==
In a 2009 study of breast cancer, total ceramide synthase levels were increased in malignant tissue, and CerS4 was one of three ceramide synthases to show an increase in mRNA levels. A significant correlation was found between CerS4 and CerS2/CerS6 expression. Unlike CerS1 and CerS5, CerS4 does not sensitize cells to chemotherapeutic drugs.

CerS4 may also be involved in the control of body weight and food intake. Upon administration of leptin, a decrease in ceramide levels was observed in rat white adipose tissue, as were expression levels of a number of genes in the sphingolipid metabolic pathway, including CerS2 and CerS4.

CerS4 expression was also found to be elevated in the brain of an Alzheimer's disease mouse model.
