= Fumonisin B4 =

Chemical compound

- Molecular structure of fumonisin B4

Names
- Preferred IUPAC name (2R,2′R)-{[(5R,6R,7S,9S,18S,19S)-19-Amino-18-hydroxy-5,9-dimethylicosane-6,7-diyl]bis(oxy)}bis(4-oxobutane-1,2-dicarboxylic acid)
- Other names FB4

Identifiers
CAS Number	136379-60-7
3D model (JSmol)	Interactive image
ChEBI	CHEBI:133832
ChemSpider	22913871
PubChem CID	42608359
- InChI: InChI=1S/C34H59NO14/c1-5-6-12-21(3)32(49-31(43)18-24(34(46)47)16-29(40)41)27(48-30(42)17-23(33(44)45)15-28(38)39)14-20(2)11-9-7-8-10-13-25(36)19-26(37)22(4)35/h20-27,32,36-37H,5-19,35H2,1-4H3,(H,38,39)(H,40,41)(H,44,45)(H,46,47)/t20-,21+,22-,23+,24+,25+,26-,27-,32+/m0/s1 Key: UXDPXZQHTDAXOZ-STOIETHLSA-N; InChI=1S/C34H59NO13/c1-5-6-14-22(3)32(48-31(42)20-25(34(45)46)18-29(39)40)27(47-30(41)19-24(33(43)44)17-28(37)38)16-21(2)13-11-9-7-8-10-12-15-26(36)23(4)35/h21-27,32,36H,5-20,35H2,1-4H3,(H,37,38)(H,39,40)(H,43,44)(H,45,46)/t21-,22+,23-,24+,25+,26-,27-,32+/m0/s1 Key: WYYKRDVIBOEORL-JLCKPESSSA-N
- SMILES: CCCCC(C)C(C(CC(C)CCCCCCCCC(C(C)N)O)OC(=O)CC(CC(=O)O)C(=O)O)OC(=O)CC(CC(=O)O)C(=O)O

Properties
Chemical formula	C_{34}H_{59}NO_{13}
Molar mass	689.83 g/mol
Appearance	White to off-white powder
- Except where otherwise noted, data are given for materials in their standard state (at 25 °C [77 °F], 100 kPa). (what is ?) Infobox references

Fumonisin B4 (or FB4) is a fumonisin mycotoxin produced mainly by the fungi Fusarium proliferatum, Fusarium verticillioides (formerly Fusarium moniliforme). Recently FB4 has been detected in fungi Aspergillus niger and in several Tolypocladium species.

FB4 is similar to fumonisin B2 and fumonisin B3 but it is lacking a hydroxy group located gamma- to the amino substituent while lacking two hydroxy groups compared to fumonisin B1.

Fumonisin B4 was first described in 1991.

== Isomers ==
Several isomers of Fumonisin B4 have been detected. A larger group is the partially hydrolysed form, denoted as PHFB4, which has been detected using HPLC-ITMS. Another significant isomer is the 3-epi-FB4, which has been identified using NMR, it has also been shown that this isomer occur 10-40% of the regular FB4 sample in nature.

== Toxicity ==
Fumonisin B4 belongs to the class of FB analogues, which is the most significant group from toxicity perspective. Currently Fumonisin B4's toxicity compared to Fumonisin B1 or B2 is unknown as further research is actively ongoing, however in nature its concentration is significantly lower. Fumonisin B4 inhibits sphingosine acyltransferase.

Fumonisin B4 and other fumonisins frequently contaminate maize and other crops.
