= Propane-1,2,3-tricarboxylic acid =

Names
- Preferred IUPAC name Propane-1,2,3-tricarboxylic acid
- Other names: Tricarballylic acid; Carballylic acid; 3-carboxypentane–1,5-dioic acid; 1,2,3-Propanetricarboxylic acid; β-Carboxyglutaric acid

Identifiers
CAS Number	99-14-9
3D model (JSmol)	Interactive image
ChemSpider	14220
ECHA InfoCard	100.002.485
PubChem CID	14925
UNII	RA5QH2J020
CompTox Dashboard (EPA)	DTXSID8059186
- InChI: InChI=1S/C6H8O6/c7-4(8)1-3(6(11)12)2-5(9)10/h3H,1-2H2,(H,7,8)(H,9,10)(H,11,12) Key: KQTIIICEAUMSDG-UHFFFAOYSA-N; InChI=1/C6H8O6/c7-4(8)1-3(6(11)12)2-5(9)10/h3H,1-2H2,(H,7,8)(H,9,10)(H,11,12) Key: KQTIIICEAUMSDG-UHFFFAOYAL
- SMILES: C(C(CC(=O)O)C(=O)O)C(=O)O

Properties
Chemical formula	C_{6}H_{8}O_{6}
Molar mass	176.124 g·mol^{−1}
Melting point	156-161
Solubility in water	Soluble

Related compounds
Related compounds	citric acid
- Except where otherwise noted, data are given for materials in their standard state (at 25 °C [77 °F], 100 kPa). verify (what is ?) Infobox references

Propane-1,2,3-tricarboxylic acid, also known as tricarballylic acid, carballylic acid, and β-carboxyglutaric acid, is a tricarboxylic acid. The compound is an inhibitor of the enzyme aconitase and therefore interferes with the Krebs cycle.

Esters of propane-1,2,3-tricarboxylic acid are found in natural products such as the mycotoxins fumonisins B1 and B2 and AAL toxin T_{A}, and in macrocyclic inhibitors of Ras farnesyl-protein transferase (FPTase) such as actinoplanic acid.

Propane-1,2,3-tricarboxylic acid can be synthesized in two steps from fumaric acid.

== Mechanism of the inhibition of aconitase ==
Aconitase normally catalyses, via the intermediate aconitic acid, the interconversion of citric acid into isocitric acid. Propane-1,2,3-tricarboxylic acid is well suited to bind to aconitase as it only lacks the hydroxyl group in comparison to citric acid. However, the hydroxyl group is essential to proceed from citric acid to aconitic acid; therefore, the enzyme is not able to complete the reaction with propane-1,2,3-tricarboxylic acid.

Citric acid

Aconitic acid

Isocitric acid
