= Ditz =

Ditz may refer to:

- Cordula Ditz (born 1972), German artist and musician
- Nancy Ditz (born 1954), former American long-distance runner
- John Ditz, former NASCAR Grand National Series car owner
- Ditz (Fils), a river of Baden-Württemberg, Germany, tributary of the Fils
- Ditz (band), an English rock band from Brighton
- A scatterbrained person, especially a woman

== See also ==
- Dit (disambiguation)
