= DIT =

DIT or dit may refer to:

== People ==
- Dit name, an alternative family name, e.g., in French Canadian historical traditions
- Dit Clapper (1907–1978), Canadian ice hockey player

== Information technology ==
- Directory information tree
- dit (unit), a contraction for "decimal digit"
- "." or dot, the shorter of the two symbols used in Morse code
- Doctor of Information Technology, a degree
- Distributed Information Technology
- Dead Internet theory
- Diffusion transformer (DiT), a diffusion model that uses a transformer as its backbone

== Educational institutions ==
- Dehradun Institute of Technology, in India
- Delhi Institute of Technology, in India
- Detroit Institute of Technology, in the US
- DigiPen Institute of Technology, in the US
- Dublin Institute of Technology, in Ireland

== Sports ==
- DIT FC, Dili, East Timor, a soccer team
- DIT GAA, Dublin, Ireland, a Gaelic football team

== Science ==
- Defining Issues Test DIT-2, of moral reasoning
- Dietary induced thermogenesis
- Diiodotyrosine, a chemical compound
- Dual inheritance theory
- Digital ion trap

== Other uses ==
- Department for Infrastructure and Transport, South Australian government department
- Department for International Trade, UK
- Diggers Rest railway station, Melbourne
- Digital imaging technician, in the film industry
- Dit, a French narrative poetic form of the Middle Ages (see Medieval French literature)
- Diyari language (ISO 639 code: dit)
