= Fumonisin B1 esterase =

Enzyme

Identifiers
- EC no.: 3.1.1.87

Databases
- BRENDA: enzyme data
- ExPASy: NiceZyme view
- KEGG: enzyme entry
- MetaCyc: metabolic pathway
- Rhea: reactions
- PDB structures: RCSB PDB PDBe PDBsum
Search
- PMC: articles
- PubMed: articles
- NCBI: proteins

The enzyme fumonisin B1 esterase (EC 3.1.1.87, fumD (gene); systematic name fumonisin B1 acylhydrolase) catalyses the reaction

fumonisin B1
2 H_{2}O
aminopentol
+ 2
propane-1,2,3-tricarboxylic acid

The enzyme characterised from a bacterium of Sphingopyxis species hydrolyses the mycotoxin, fumonisin B1, to aminopentol by removing two ester groups. Fumonisins are found as unwanted toxins produced by fusarium fungii in food, and the enzyme has been suggested as a method for decontamination.
