= Ceramide synthase 2 =

Protein found in humans

CERS2

Identifiers
- Aliases: CERS2, L3, LASS2, SP260, TMSG1, ceramide synthase 2
- External IDs: OMIM: 606920; MGI: 1924143; GeneCards: CERS2
Enzyme activity
EC #	BRENDA	ExPASy	KEGG	MetaCyc
2.3.1.24	↗	↗	↗	↗
2.3.1.297	↗	↗	↗	↗

Gene location (Human)
Chr.	Chromosome 1 (human)
Band	1q21.3	Start	150,960,583 bp
Band	1q21.3	End	150,975,003 bp

Gene location (Mouse)
Chr.	Chromosome 3 (mouse)
Band	3|3 F2.1	Start	95,222,102 bp
Band	3|3 F2.1	End	95,230,910 bp
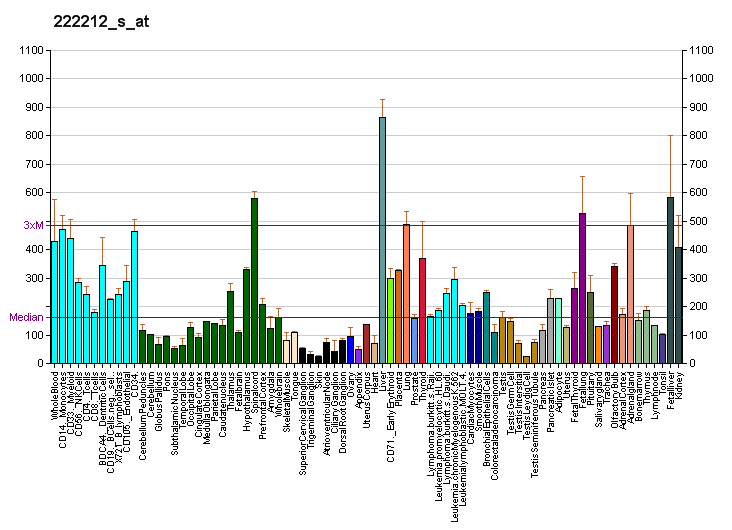
RNA expression pattern
Bgee	Human / Mouse (ortholog); Top expressed in: right adrenal cortex; left adrenal gland; right lobe of liver; left adrenal cortex; C1 segment; secondary oocyte; islet of Langerhans; right lung; upper lobe of left lung; tibial nerve / Top expressed in: right kidney; granulocyte; yolk sac; genital tubercle; proximal tubule; left lobe of liver; saccule; tail of embryo; gastrula; right lung lobe; More reference expression data
BioGPS	More reference expression data
Gene ontology
Molecular function	DNA binding; protein binding; sphingosine N-acyltransferase activity
Cellular component	integral component of membrane; endoplasmic reticulum membrane; membrane; nucleus; endoplasmic reticulum; nuclear membrane
Biological process	ceramide biosynthetic process; sphingolipid biosynthetic process; lipid metabolism; negative regulation of axon regeneration; negative regulation of Schwann cell migration; negative regulation of Schwann cell proliferation involved in axon regeneration
Sources:Amigo / QuickGO
Orthologs
Databases	NCBI: entry; OMA: entry
Species	Human	Mouse
Entrez	29956	76893
Ensembl	ENSG00000143418	ENSMUSG00000015714
UniProt	Q96G23	Q924Z4
RefSeq (mRNA)	NM_013384; NM_022075; NM_181746	NM_029789; NM_001320492
RefSeq (protein)	NP_071358; NP_859530	NP_001307421; NP_084065
Location (UCSC)	Chr 1: 150.96 – 150.98 Mb	Chr 3: 95.22 – 95.23 Mb
PubMed search
- Wikidata
View/Edit Human	View/Edit Mouse

Ceramide synthase 2, also known as LAG1 longevity assurance homolog 2 or Tumor metastasis-suppressor gene 1 protein, is an enzyme that in humans is encoded by the CERS2 gene.

Ceramide synthase 2 is a ceramide synthase that catalyses the synthesis of very long acyl chain ceramides, including C20 and C26 ceramides. It is the most ubiquitously expressed of all CerS and has the broadest distribution in the human body.

CerS2 was first identified in 2001. It contains the conserved TLC domain and Hox-like domain common to almost all CerS.

== Distribution ==
CerS2 mRNA (TRH3) has been found in most tissues and it is strongly expressed in liver, intestine and brain. CerS2 is much more widely distributed than Ceramide synthase 1 (CerS1) and is found in at least 12 tissues in the human body, with high expression in the kidney and liver, and moderate expression in the brain and other organs. In the mouse brain, CerS2 is mainly expressed white matter tracts, specifically in oligodendrocytes and Schwann cells.

== Function ==
Expression of CerS2 is transiently increased during periods of active myelination, suggesting that it is important for the synthesis of myelin sphingolipids. The lack of CerS2, as shown in knockout mice, induces the autophagy and activation of the unfolded protein response (UPR). These mice showed no decrease in overall ceramide level, but levels of sphinganine were elevated. They also developed severe liver disease, but there was no observable change in the kidneys.

The CerS2 gene is compact in size and is located in a chromosomal region that is replicated early in the cell cycle. CerS2 activity is regulated by sphingosine-1-phosphate (S1P) via two sphingosine-1-phosphate receptor-like residues on CerS2 that operate independently.

== Pathological significance ==
CerS2 levels are significantly elevated in breast cancer tissue compared to normal tissue, along with increased levels of ceramide synthase 6 (CerS6).

CerS2 was also implicated in the control of body weight. The administration of leptin to rats induced a decrease in CerS2 was observed in white adipose tissue.
