= Fumonisin =

Group of chemical compounds

The chemical structure of fumonisin B1.

Fumonisin refers to any one of a class of related chemical structures, the fumonisins, that constitute a group of fungal mycotoxins originally identified with genus Fusarium, a mycotoxin known for its contamination of infested corn seed (as well as other plants and foodstuffs), the infecting species, in particular, being within Fusarium's Liseola section. As shown in the example in the figure (of fumonisin B1), members of the family are composed of a central "chai[n] of about 20 carbons", and bear an "acidic ester, acetylamino and sometimes other substituents". The fumonisins inhibit ceramide synthetase, an enzyme that converts sphingolipids to ceramides.

== Family background ==
As of 2000, 15 different fumonisins had been reported, and other minor metabolites have been characterized. More specifically, the term refers primarily to the family of compounds that includes the widely studied fumonisins B1, B2, B3, and B4, as well as others. As chemical agents, the fumonisins are distinct from the large family of Fusarium trichothecene (T-2-type) mycotoxins, and from the Fusarium estrogenic metabolite, zearalenone, an F-2-type mycotoxin.

In 2015, a unique supposed class of non-aminated fumonisins was reported on grapes infected with Aspergillus welwitschiae, where toxicities have not yet been established.

== Mechanisms of toxicity ==
The fumonisins inhibit ceramide synthetase (sphingosine N-acyltransferase), an enzyme that converts sphingolipids to ceramides.

== Other research ==
It has been suggested that the fumonisins are not genotoxic, and so might belong to the peroxisome proliferator class of non-genotoxic carcinogens.
