= Fumonisin B2 =

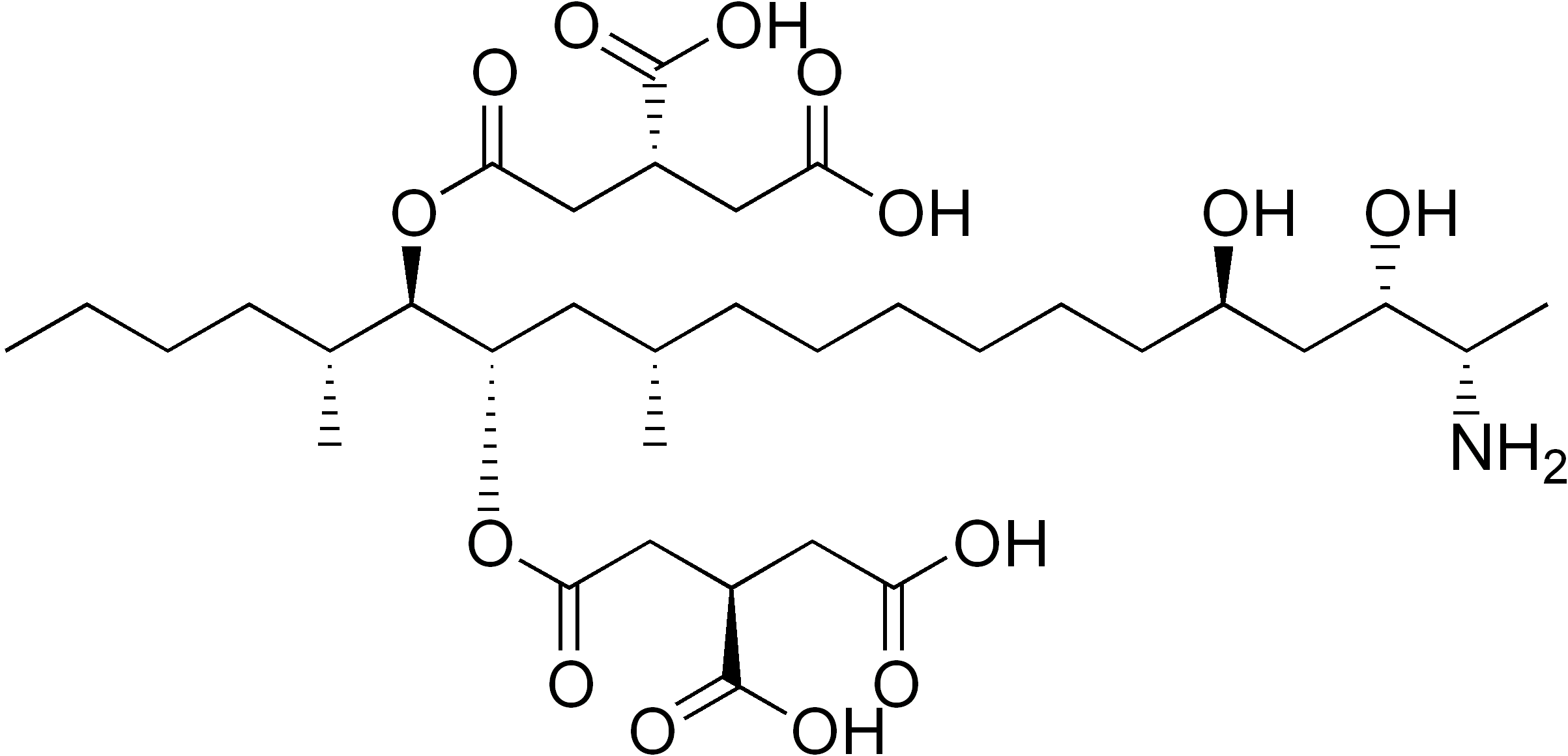

Names
- Preferred IUPAC name (2R,2′R)-{[(5R,6R,7S,9S,16R,18S,19S)-19-Amino-16,18-dihydroxy-5,9-dimethylicosane-6,7-diyl]bis[oxy(2-oxoethane-2,1-diyl)]}dibutanedioic acid
- Other names FB2

Identifiers
CAS Number	116355-84-1
3D model (JSmol)	Interactive image
ChEBI	CHEBI:38225
ChemSpider	2015284
ECHA InfoCard	100.114.556
KEGG	C19242
PubChem CID	2733489
UNII	UX4WHT4MKB
CompTox Dashboard (EPA)	DTXSID80891857
- InChI: InChI=1S/C34H59NO14/c1-5-6-12-21(3)32(49-31(43)18-24(34(46)47)16-29(40)41)27(48-30(42)17-23(33(44)45)15-28(38)39)14-20(2)11-9-7-8-10-13-25(36)19-26(37)22(4)35/h20-27,32,36-37H,5-19,35H2,1-4H3,(H,38,39)(H,40,41)(H,44,45)(H,46,47)/t20-,21+,22-,23+,24+,25+,26-,27-,32+/m0/s1 Key: UXDPXZQHTDAXOZ-STOIETHLSA-N; InChI=1/C34H59NO14/c1-5-6-12-21(3)32(49-31(43)18-24(34(46)47)16-29(40)41)27(48-30(42)17-23(33(44)45)15-28(38)39)14-20(2)11-9-7-8-10-13-25(36)19-26(37)22(4)35/h20-27,32,36-37H,5-19,35H2,1-4H3,(H,38,39)(H,40,41)(H,44,45)(H,46,47)/t20-,21+,22-,23+,24+,25+,26-,27-,32+/m0/s1 Key: UXDPXZQHTDAXOZ-STOIETHLBE
- SMILES: O=C(O)C[C@@H](C(=O)O)CC(=O)O[C@@H](C[C@@H](C)CCCCCC[C@@H](O)C[C@H](O)[C@@H](N)C)[C@H](OC(=O)C[C@H](C(=O)O)CC(=O)O)[C@H](C)CCCC

Properties
Chemical formula	C_{34}H_{59}NO_{14}
Molar mass	705.83 g/mol
- Except where otherwise noted, data are given for materials in their standard state (at 25 °C [77 °F], 100 kPa). verify (what is ?) Infobox references

Fumonisin B2 is a fumonisin mycotoxin produced by the fungi Fusarium verticillioides (formerly Fusarium moniliforme) and Aspergillus niger.

It is a structural analog of fumonisin B3, while it is lacking one hydroxy group compared to fumonisin B1.

Fumonisin B2 is more cytotoxic than fumonisin B1. Fumonisin B2 inhibits sphingosine acyltransferase.

Fumonisin B2 and other fumonisins frequently infect maize and other crops, while recently it has been shown using LC–MS/MS that FB2 can contaminate coffee beans as well.
