= Ceramide synthase 3 =

Protein-coding gene in the species Homo sapiens

CERS3

Identifiers
- Aliases: CERS3, ARCI9, LASS3, ceramide synthase 3
- External IDs: OMIM: 615276; MGI: 2681008; GeneCards: CERS3
Enzyme activity
EC #	BRENDA	ExPASy	KEGG	MetaCyc
2.3.1.24	↗	↗	↗	↗
2.3.1.297	↗	↗	↗	↗
2.3.1.298	↗	↗	↗	↗

Gene location (Human)
Chr.	Chromosome 15 (human)
Band	15q26.3	Start	100,400,395 bp
Band	15q26.3	End	100,544,995 bp

Gene location (Mouse)
Chr.	Chromosome 7 (mouse)
Band	7|7 C	Start	66,393,252 bp
Band	7|7 C	End	66,473,439 bp
RNA expression pattern
Bgee	Human / Mouse (ortholog); Top expressed in: skin of abdomen; skin of leg; gums; oral cavity; gingival epithelium; vulva; skin of thigh; buccal mucosa cell; human penis; vagina / Top expressed in: spermatocyte; transitional epithelium of urinary bladder; esophagus; seminiferous tubule; spermatid; conjunctival fornix; skin of back; skin of abdomen; skin of external ear; lip; More reference expression data
BioGPS	n/a
Gene ontology
Molecular function	transferase activity; DNA binding; sphingosine N-acyltransferase activity; DNA-binding transcription factor activity, RNA polymerase II-specific
Cellular component	integral component of membrane; nuclear membrane; endoplasmic reticulum membrane; nucleus; membrane; endoplasmic reticulum
Biological process	ceramide biosynthetic process; sphingolipid biosynthetic process; keratinocyte differentiation; lipid metabolism; regulation of transcription by RNA polymerase II
Sources:Amigo / QuickGO
Orthologs
Databases	NCBI: entry; OMA: entry
Species	Human	Mouse
Entrez	204219	545975
Ensembl	ENSG00000154227	ENSMUSG00000030510
UniProt	Q8IU89	Q1A3B0
RefSeq (mRNA)	NM_001290341; NM_001290342; NM_001290343; NM_178842; NM_001378789	NM_001164201
RefSeq (protein)	NP_001277270; NP_001277271; NP_001277272; NP_849164; NP_001365718	NP_001157673
Location (UCSC)	Chr 15: 100.4 – 100.54 Mb	Chr 7: 66.39 – 66.47 Mb
PubMed search
- Wikidata
View/Edit Human	View/Edit Mouse

Ceramide synthase 3 (CersS3), also known as longevity assurance homologue 3, is an enzyme that is encoded in humans by the CERS3 gene.

== Function ==
CerS3 synthesizes C24-ceramides and ceramides with longer acyl chains, and is found mainly in skin and testis. Specifically, CerS3 synthesizes ceramides containing α-hydroxy (2-hydroxy) fatty acids, which are abundant in skin tissue, where they help maintain the water permeability barrier qualities of the skin. It is found in large quantities in keratinocytes, and this increases during keratinocyte differentiation.

In the testes, CerS3 is involved in sperm formation and androgen production. Cers3 gene expression is located within germ cells, where it is massively upregulated during juvenile testicular maturation. This upregulation is correlated with increase in levels of glycosphingolipids containing very long chain (C26-C32) polyunsaturated fatty acid (LC-PUFA), which are required for spermatogenesis.

== Tissue and cellular distribution ==
CerS3 (T3l) mRNA is strongly expressed in skin, and was also found in brain, lung and kidney. CerS3 is mainly found in the skin and testes. CerS3 is not detectable in the brain or the sciatic nerve. Like other ceramide synthases, CerS3 is found in the endoplasmic reticulum within the cell.

== Structure ==
CerS3 has a molecular mass of 46.2 kDa, 383 amino acids, and six transmembrane domains. Like other ceramide synthases, CerS3 contains a Hox-like domain. CerS3 is the only ceramide synthase for which splice variants have not been reported.
