= Ceramide synthase 5 =

Protein-coding gene in the species Homo sapiens

CERS5

Identifiers
- Aliases: CERS5, LASS5, Trh4, ceramide synthase 5
- External IDs: OMIM: 615335; MGI: 1919199; GeneCards: CERS5
Available structures
PDB	Ortholog search: PDBe RCSB
PDB	List of PDB id codes 2CQX
Enzyme activity
EC #	BRENDA	ExPASy	KEGG	MetaCyc
2.3.1.24	↗	↗	↗	↗
2.3.1.291	↗	↗	↗	↗

Gene location (Human)
Chr.	Chromosome 12 (human)
Band	12q13.12	Start	50,129,289 bp
Band	12q13.12	End	50,167,533 bp

Gene location (Mouse)
Chr.	Chromosome 15 (mouse)
Band	15|15 F1	Start	99,632,762 bp
Band	15|15 F1	End	99,670,766 bp
RNA expression pattern
Bgee	Human / Mouse (ortholog); Top expressed in: cerebellar hemisphere; right hemisphere of cerebellum; ventricular zone; ganglionic eminence; stromal cell of endometrium; anterior pituitary; right frontal lobe; nucleus accumbens; hypothalamus; Brodmann area 9 / Top expressed in: skin of external ear; olfactory epithelium; retinal pigment epithelium; endothelial cell of lymphatic vessel; ciliary body; vestibular sensory epithelium; motor neuron; cumulus cell; renal corpuscle; skin of abdomen; More reference expression data
BioGPS	n/a
Gene ontology
Molecular function	transferase activity; DNA binding; sphingosine N-acyltransferase activity
Cellular component	integral component of membrane; nuclear membrane; endoplasmic reticulum membrane; nucleus; membrane; endoplasmic reticulum
Biological process	ceramide biosynthetic process; sphingolipid biosynthetic process; lipid metabolism; sphingolipid metabolic process
Sources:Amigo / QuickGO
Orthologs
Databases	NCBI: entry; OMA: entry
Species	Human	Mouse
Entrez	91012	71949
Ensembl	ENSG00000139624	ENSMUSG00000023021
UniProt	Q8N5B7	Q9D6K9
RefSeq (mRNA)	NM_001281731; NM_147190; NM_001331069; NM_001331070; NM_001331071 NM_001331072; NM_001331073	NM_028015
RefSeq (protein)	NP_001268660; NP_001317998; NP_001317999; NP_001318000; NP_001318001 NP_001318002; NP_671723	NP_082291
Location (UCSC)	Chr 12: 50.13 – 50.17 Mb	Chr 15: 99.63 – 99.67 Mb
PubMed search
- Wikidata
View/Edit Human	View/Edit Mouse

Ceramide synthase 5

Identifiers
- Symbol: CerS5
- Alt. symbols: LASS5
- NCBI gene: 91012
- HGNC: 23749
- OMIM: 615335
- PDB: 2CQX
- RefSeq: NM_147190
- UniProt: Q8N5B7

Other data
- EC number: 2.3.1.24
- Locus: Chr. 12 q13.12
Search for
- Structures: Swiss-model
- Domains: InterPro

Ceramide synthase 5 (CerS5) is the enzyme encoded in humans by the CERS5 gene.

== Function ==
CerS5 robustly synthesizes C16-ceramide, which is often considered to be an important pro-apoptotic ceramide. De novo ceramide synthesis is an essential trigger for Bax activation in hypoxia/reoxygenation. Following hypoxia/reoxygenation, CerS5 expression is elevated. Upon knocking down acid sphingomyelinase and CerS5 in NTERA-2 cells, Bax localization to mitochondria was reduced, indicating the importance of CerS5 activity in the apoptosis pathway.

== Tissue distribution ==
CerS5 (TRH4) mRNA is found in all tissues and is strongly expressed in muscle and brain. CerS5 is the major ceramide synthase detected in lung epithelia. Knock-down research in respiratory epithelium using CerS5 siRNA or fumonisin B1 reduced total CerS activity by 45% or 78%, respectively, indicating that CerS5 indeed contributes significantly to ceramide synthesis in lung. In the brain, CerS5 mRNA is detected in most cells within the gray and white matter tissues.

== Clinical significance ==
CerS5 sensitizes cells to the chemotherapeutic drugs doxorubicin and vincristine, but not to cisplatin or carboplatin.

A splice variant of CerS5 is expressed in lymphoma and other tumor cells and contribute to tumor recognition by the immune system. In response to upregulation of tumor suppressor protein p53, C16-ceramide levels were increased in leukemia and colon cancer cells, as were levels of CerS5 mRNA in the leukemia cells, but not in the colon cancer cells. For this reason, CerS5 looks like a promising target for the regulation of cancer and of cell death pathways.
