= Digital ion trap =

Scientific analytical tool

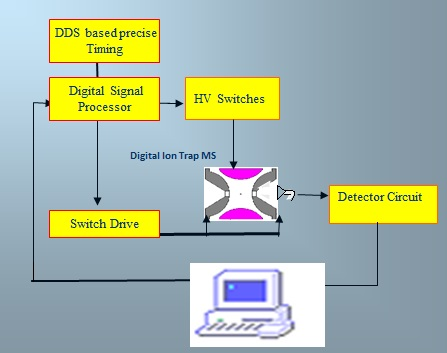
A digital ion trap mass spectrometer

The digital ion trap (DIT) is an quadrupole ion trap driven by digital signals, typically in a rectangular waveform, generated by switching rapidly between discrete DC voltage levels. The digital ion trap has been mainly developed as a mass analyzer.

== History ==
A digital ion trap (DIT) is an ion trap having a trapping waveform generated by the rapid switching between discrete high-voltage levels. The timing of the high voltage switch is controlled precisely with digital electronic circuitry. Ion motion in a quadrupole ion trap driven by a rectangular wave signal was theoretically studied in 1970s by Sheretov, E.P. and Richards, J.A. Sheretov also implemented the pulsed waveform drive for the quadrupole ion trap working in mass-selective instability mode, although no resonance excitation/ejection was used.

The idea was substantially revisited by Ding L. and Kumashiro S. in 1999, where the ion stability in the rectangular wave quadrupole field was mapped in the Mathieu space a-q coordinate system, with the parameters a and q having the same definition as the Mathieu parameters normally used in dealing with sinusoidal RF driven quadrupole field. The secular frequency dependence on the a, q parameters was also derived thus the foundation was laid for many modern ion trap operation modes based on the resonance excitation.

Also, in 1999, Peter T.A. Reilly began trapping and subsequently ablating and mass analyzing the product ions from nanoparticles obtained from car exhaust with a primitive hybrid square wave/sine wave driven 3D ion trap. In 2001 Reilly attended the 49th American Society for Mass Spectrometry (ASMS) Conference on Mass Spectrometry and Applied Topics where he presented his nanoparticle mass analysis work and met Li Ding for the first time. Reilly suggested to Ding at that time that they should focus the DIT for analysis in the high mass range where other instruments could not compete. However, work published by Ding and Shimadzu over the years following the 2001 meeting were focused on development of square wave driven DIT's in the conventional mass range of commercial instrumentation. During this time Reilly began developing digital waveforms to increase the mass range of quadrupole-based mass spectrometers and ion traps that operate with rectangular waveforms.

Over the course of eighteen years, the Reilly group contributed substantially to the development of modern digital waveform technology (DWT), its implementation and characterization, methods of waveform generation, and general theory which includes but is not limited to stability diagrams, the pseudopotential model, and more recently digital quadrupole acceptance. In parallel to Reilly's achievements but also working separately, the Ding group at the Shimadzu Research Lab continued to implement their digital drive technology for a 3D ion trap. Finally, after 18 years Shimadzu unveiled a bench top MALDI square wave driven 3D ion trap mass spectrometer that was designed to work in the higher mass range at the 2019 ASMS conference. The DIT technology has also been developed and implemented in the linear and 3D quadrupole ion traps by many other groups around the world.

== The Stability Under the Digital Drive ==
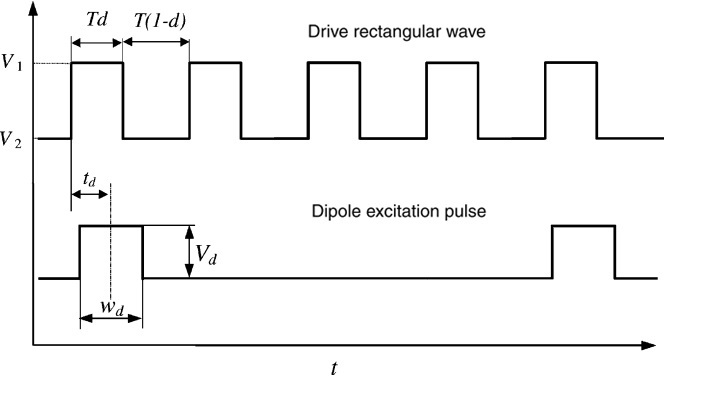
Fig 1. The drive signal waveform, and the dipole excitation waveform for a digital ion trap (3D)

For a 3D type of quadrupole ion trap, ion motion under the influence of a digital waveform (see figure right) can be expressed in terms of the conventional trapping parameters:

$$a_z = -\frac {8eU} {m r_0^2 \Omega^2} \qquad\qquad (1) \!$$

and

$$q_z =  \frac {4eV} {m r_0^2 \Omega^2} . \qquad\qquad (2) \!$$

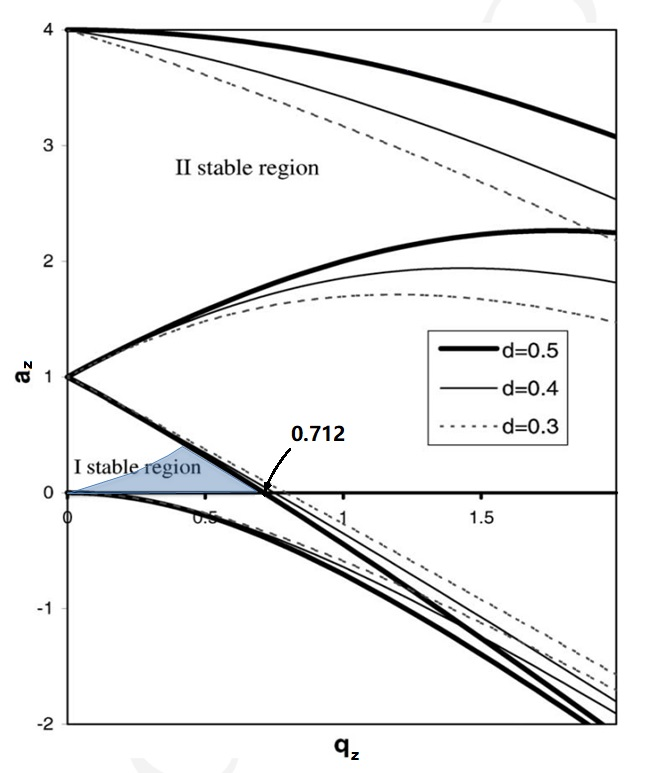
Fig 2. The stability diagram of ion motion in z direction, for 3 different duty cycles of a digital drive waveform

Here, Ω =2πf is the angular frequency of the digital waveform. Similar definitions of the $a , q$ for the 2D (linear) ion trap were also given in literature. There are at least two postulates about the nature of the DC component. The first, of which has been attributed to Ding, assumes for the DIT that the DC component, U depends on not only the mid-level of the AC voltages, V_{1}and V_{2}, but also the duty cycle, d of the waveform:

$$U = dV_1 + (1-d) V_2$$

Whereas, the second but more general postulate assumes that there is no DC component unless there is an explicit DC voltage offset added to the waveforms. The latter interpretation is explained by the change to the stability diagram that results when the duty cycle moves away from d = 0.5. When this happens the range of stable q and a values for both quadrupole axes change. These changes cause the motion of ions to be more displaced along one axis compared to the other. This, consequently is the effect of the DC bias.

It is important to accurately know the stability of ions inside the DIT. For example, different waveform duty cycles result in a different stability boundary. For the case of a square wave, where d = 0.5, the boundary of the first stability region crosses the $q_z$ axis at approximately 0.712, which is less than 0.908, the boundary value $q_z$ for a sinusoidal waveform. The stability of ion motion in a digitally driven quadrupole can be calculated from the analytical matrix solutions of Hill's equation:

$$\mathbf  V(f_n, \tau_n)=\begin{bmatrix} cos(\tau_n\sqrt{f_n)} & 1/\sqrt{f_n} sin(\tau_n\sqrt{f_n}\\ -\sqrt{f_n}sin(\tau_n\sqrt{f_n}) & cos(\tau_n\sqrt{f_n}) \end{bmatrix}  \qquad  f_n >0 \qquad\qquad\qquad (3a)$$

$$\mathbf  V(f_n, \tau_n)=\begin{bmatrix} cosh(\tau_n\sqrt{-f_n)} & 1/\sqrt{-f_n} sinh(\tau_n\sqrt{-f_n}\\ \sqrt{-f_n}sinh(\tau_n\sqrt{-f_n}) & cosh(\tau_n\sqrt{-f_n}) \end{bmatrix}  \qquad  f_n < 0 \qquad\qquad (3b)$$

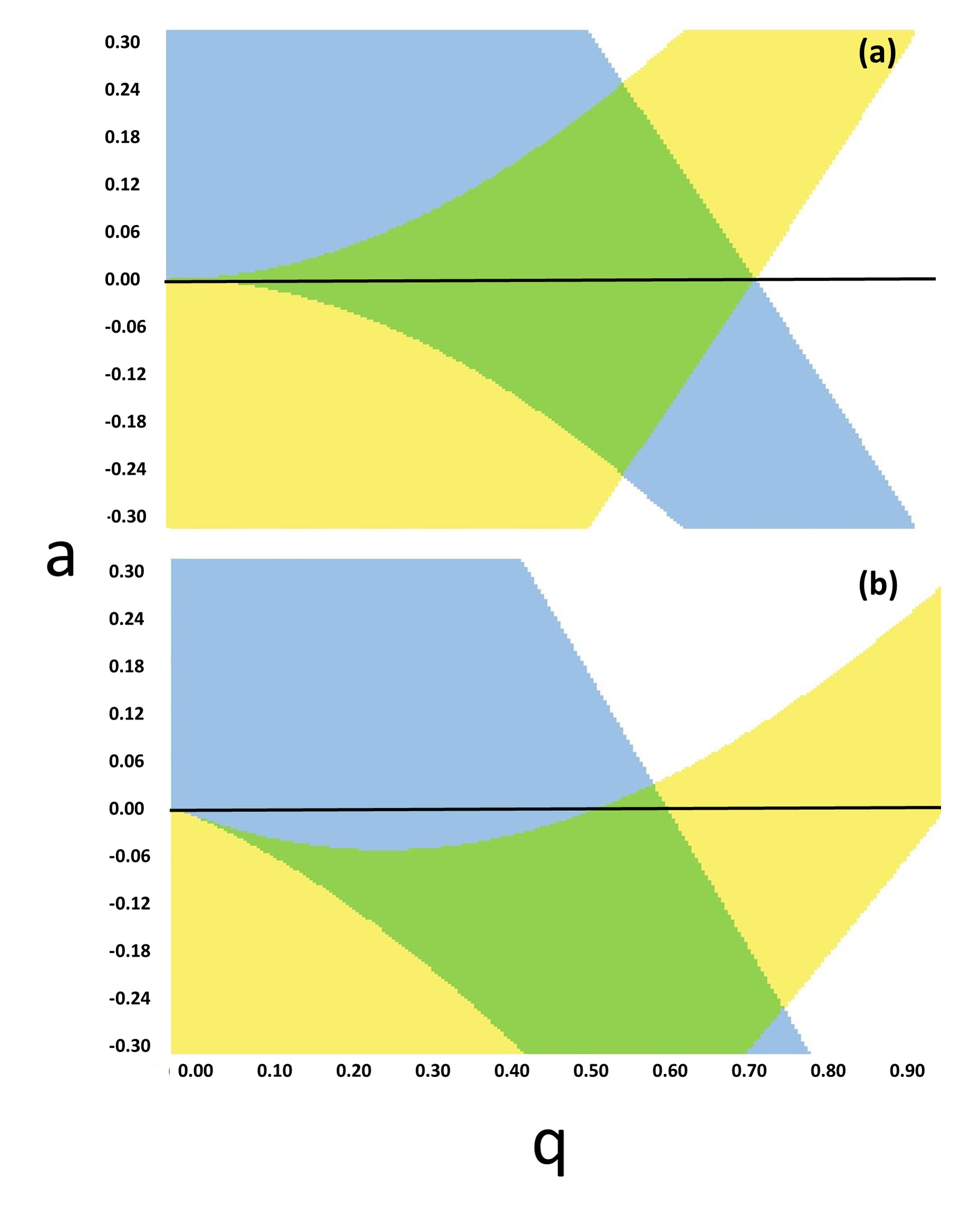
Fig 3. Mathieu space (q,a) stability diagrams for a linear digital ion trap and two duty cycles (a) d = 0.50 and (b) d = 0.60. The horizontal line indicates the range of stable q values when the parameter a = 0. The green regions indicate conditions that are completely stable. The blue regions indicate conditions that are stable along the x-axis only. The yellow regions indicate conditions that are stable along the y-axis only.

The analytical solutions apply to any periodic function so long as each period, $T$ can be represented as a series of n constant potential steps $T = \sum^n_1 t_n$. Each constant potential step is represented in dimensionless Mathieu space by the waveform potential parameter $f = a\pm2q$, where q and a were defined earlier by (1) and (2). The value $\tau_n = t_n\pi$ in (3) is the temporal width of the constant potential step. In a digital system that is operated without a physical DC offset the waveform potential reduces to the value $\pm 2q$. The sign of the parameter will depend on the sign of the constant potential at each step, and the appropriate matrix will depend on the sign of the parameter. Because a digital waveform may be approximated as existing in only high and low states (potential sign), the stability of ions, as demonstrated by Brabeck, may be determined in as few as two or three constant potential steps. In the simple but frequent case that a full cycle of a digital waveform can be represented by two constant potential steps, the matrix representing the first potential step would be multiplied onto the matrix representing the second potential step. In the general case, the final matrix of a waveform cycle defined by n constant potential steps is:

$\mathbf M=\mathbf V(f_1,\tau_1)\times \mathbf V(f_2,\tau_2)...\times \mathbf V(f_n, \tau_n) \qquad\qquad\qquad(4)$

The matrix (4) is often referred to as the transfer matrix. It is used to evaluate whether an ion will have stable motion. If the absolute value of the trace of this matrix is less than 2 the ion is said to have stable motion. Stable motion simply means that the secular oscillation of the ion has a maximum displacement. When the absolute value of the trace is greater than 2 ion motion is not stable and the displacement of the ion increases with each secular oscillation.

Ion trajectories in a linear or 3D DIT as well as in a digital mass filter, may also be calculated using a similar procedure. Unlike stability calculation it is advantageous for the purpose of resolution and accuracy to represent each period of the waveform with an adequate number of constant voltage steps. The trajectory for the constant potential step, $k$, for example, is calculated by multiplication of the appropriate matrix (3) for that step onto the trajectory vector of the step, $k-1$:

$\binom {u_k}{\dot u_k}=\mathbf V(f_k, \tau_k)\binom{u_{k-1}}{\dot u_{k-1}} \qquad \qquad (5)$

A stability diagram may be generated by calculating the matrix trace for each axis over a defined range of q and a values. The stability diagram of a square wave is very similar to that of the traditional harmonic quadrupole field. Having the additional parameter d in the waveform, the digital ion trap can perform certain experiments which are not available in the conventional harmonic wave RF ion trap. One example is the digital asymmetric wave isolation which is the method of using a d value around 0.6 to narrow the mass range to isolate a precursor ion.

The DIT is a versatile instrument because it is capable of operating at constant AC voltage without a DC offset for any conceivable duty cycle and frequency. The dynamic frequency does not impose a limit on the mass range. The Mathieu space stability diagram of the linear and 3D DIT change with duty cycle. When a = 0 there will be a finite range of stable q values for each quadrupole axis that will depend on the duty cycle. Fig 3 (a) shows a Mathieu space stability diagram for the duty cycle d = 0.50 of a linear DIT. The horizontal line indicates where the parameter a = 0. The range of completely stable q values appear where this line passes through the green colored region; it ranges from q = 0 to roughly q = 0.7125. The blue colored areas in the figure depict stability along the x-axis only. Yellow colored regions depict stability along the y-axis only. When the duty cycle is increased to d = 0.60 the range of completely stable q values decreases (see Fig 3 (b)) as indicated by the reduction of green that the horizontal line intersects. In this representation the total range of stable q values along the x-axis, that is defined by the intersection of the line through the blue and green regions, is greater than the total range of stable q values along the y-axis that is defined by the intersection of the line through the yellow and green regions. In Fig 3 (b) the overall stability of the linear DIT in the y direction is smaller than in the x direction. If the frequency of the linear DIT is decreased to cause a particular ion to have a q value that corresponds to right hand side boundary of the completely stable green region, then it will excite and ultimately eject in the y direction. This is the fundamental mechanism that allows control over the direction of ion excitation in a linear DIT without resonant excitation.

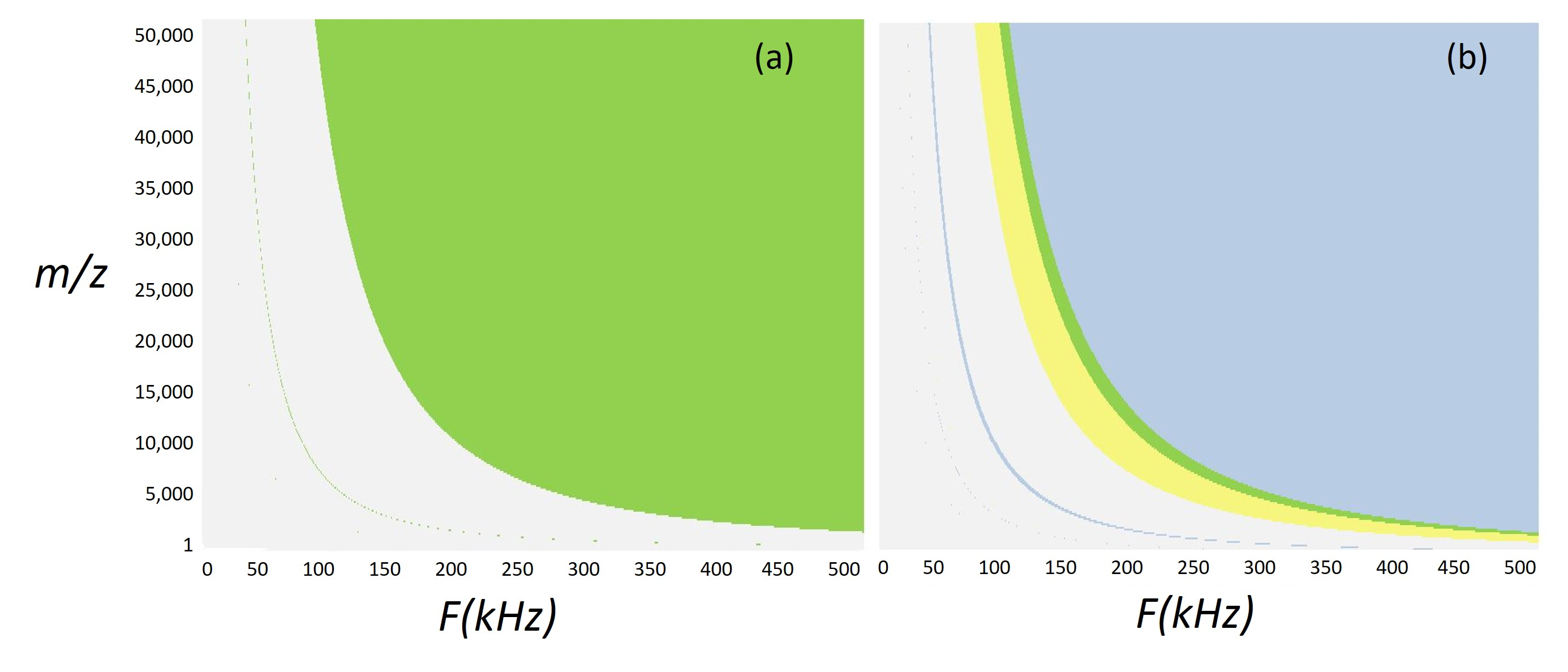
Fig 4. Stability diagram for a linear DIT in the dimensions of frequency and m/z for the duty cycles (a) d = 0.50 and (b) d = 0.60. The green region depicts x and y stability, the blue regions depict x-axis stability only and the yellow regions depict stability for the y-axis only

The DIT and other forms of digital mass analyzers scan ions by scanning the frequency of the drive waveform. The AC voltage is typically fixed during the scan. Digital devices use a duty cycle which allows them to operate completely independent of a DC voltage and without resonant excitation. When the DC voltage is zero the parameter a is also zero.

Consequently, ion stability will depend on q. With these considerations it was possible to design a new type of stability diagram that is more suitable for planning and performing experiment. In 2014 Brabeck and Reilly created a stability diagram that maps the range of stable mass-to-charge ratios, m/z to the corresponding range of drive frequencies based on several user inputs. For a particular duty cycle, the operator can quickly reference the range of stable masses at each frequency of a scan. Fig 4 (a) and (b) shows the frequency-m/z stability diagram for a linear DIT with a duty cycle of d = 0.50 and d= 0.60 respectively.

== Secular Frequency and Pseudopotential Well Depth ==
Secular frequency is the fundamental frequency component of the ion motion in the quadrupole field driven by a periodical signal, and it is usually chosen for resonance excitation of ion motion to achieve ion ejection, and/or ion energy activation which may lead to the collision induced dissociation. The secular frequency is conventionally written as:

$$\omega_z = \frac {1} {2}  \beta_z\Omega  \qquad\qquad (6) \!$$

For digital driving signal, Ding derived the expression of the secular frequency using matrix transform theory.

$$\omega_z = \frac {\Omega} {2\pi} arccos \frac {\phi_{11} + \phi_{22} } {2}$$

Where :$\phi_{11}, \phi_{22}$ are two diagonal elements of the transform matrix of ion motion. For a DC free square wave ( $a =0$ ) the transform matrix may be expressed using the stability parameter $q$, thus:

$$\beta_z = \frac {1} {\pi} arccos[cos (\pi{\sqrt{q_z/2}})cosh ( \pi {\sqrt{q_z/2}}) \qquad\qquad (7) \!$$

The formula (6) and (7) give a direct relation between the secular frequency and the digital drive waveform parameters (frequency and amplitude), without using the iterative process that is needed for a sinusoidal driven quadrupole ion trap.

Normally the depth of the 'effective potential' well, or the pseudopotential well, is used to estimate the maximum kinetic energy of ions that remain trapped. For DIT, this was also derived using Dehmelt approximation:

$D_z = \frac {{\pi}^2}{48} q_z V \approx 0.206 q_z V$ [eV]

== Instrumentation and Performance ==
Initially the digital ion trap was constructed in form of a 3D ion trap, where the drive signal was fed to the ring electrode of the trap. Instead of scanning up the RF voltage, in the DIT, the frequency of the rectangular waveform signal is scanned down during a forward mass scan. This avoided the high voltage breakdown which set the upper limitation of a mass scan. Mass range of DIT up to 18,000 Th was demonstrated by use of an atmospheric MALDI ion source and was later expanded to cover m/z of a singly charged antibody at about 900,000 Th by Koichi Tanaka etc.

The MOSFET switch circuit is responsible to provide the rectangular wave drive signal. The drive circuit of DIT is much compact compared to the RF generator with LC resonator circuit used for conventional sinusoidal wave ion trap. It also provides the capability of fast start up and fast termination of the waveform, which enables injection and ejection of ion with high efficiency. A field adjusting electrode placed adjacent to the entrance end-cap and biased with certain dc voltages helped to achieve good mass resolution for both forward and reverse mass scans, as well as for precursor isolation. With trapping voltage of +/- 1kV, a zoom scan resolving power of 19,000 was demonstrated.

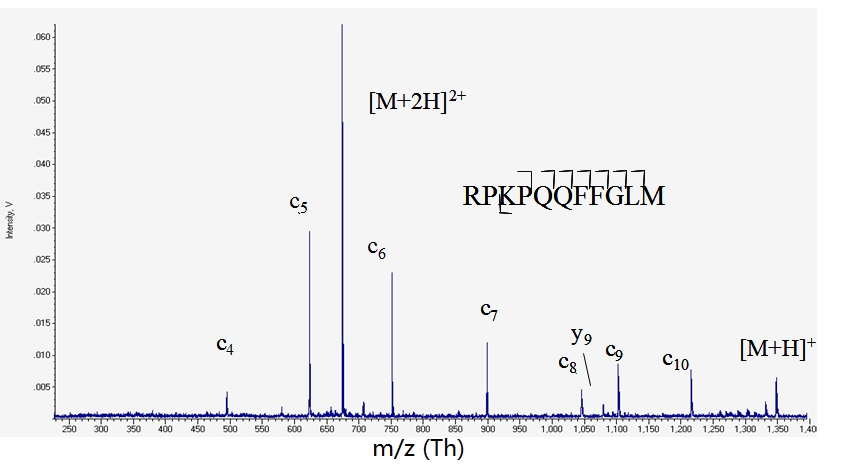
ECD MS/MS mass spectrum of Substance P by using a digital ion trap mass spectrometer

Many new features for tandem mass analysis were gradually revealed by using the digital ion trap. Ions can be selectively removed from the ion trap by boundary ejection simply by varying the duty cycle of the digital waveform, instead of applying the conventional "resolving DC" voltage. Since rectangular waveforms are employed in the DIT, electrons can be injected into the trap during one of the voltage level without being accelerated up by the varying electric field. This enabled Electron-capture dissociation, which needs very low energy electron beam to interact with the trapped ions, achieved in the digital ion trap, without assistance of a magnetic field.

Other forms of digital ion trap were also developed, including the linear ion trap constructed using printed circuit boards and the rods structure linear ion guide/trap. Two sets of switch circuitry were normally used to generate 2 phases of rectangular pulse waveform for two pairs of rods in case of the linear digital ion trap.

== Commercialization ==
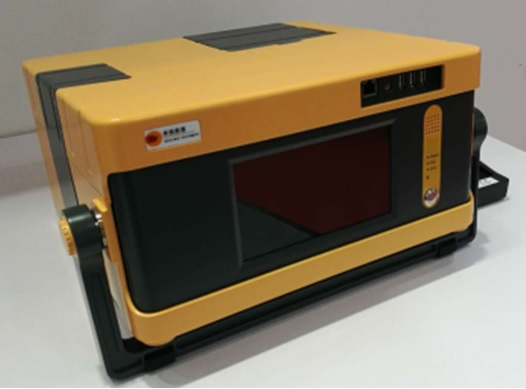
DT-100, a portable digital linear ion trap mass spectrometer by Hexin Instrument Co. Ltd

Hexin Instrument Co., Ltd (Guangzhou, China) commercialized a portable ion trap mass spectrometer DT-100 in 2017 for VOC monitoring. The mass spectrometer employs a VUV photo ionization source and a digital linear ion trap as mass analyzer. With an overall weight of 13 kg and size of 350 x 320 x 190 mm^{3} including the rechargeable Li battery. The specification includes a mass range of 20–500 Th for both MS and MS^{2}, and mass resolving resolution of 0.3 Th (FWHM) at 106 Th.

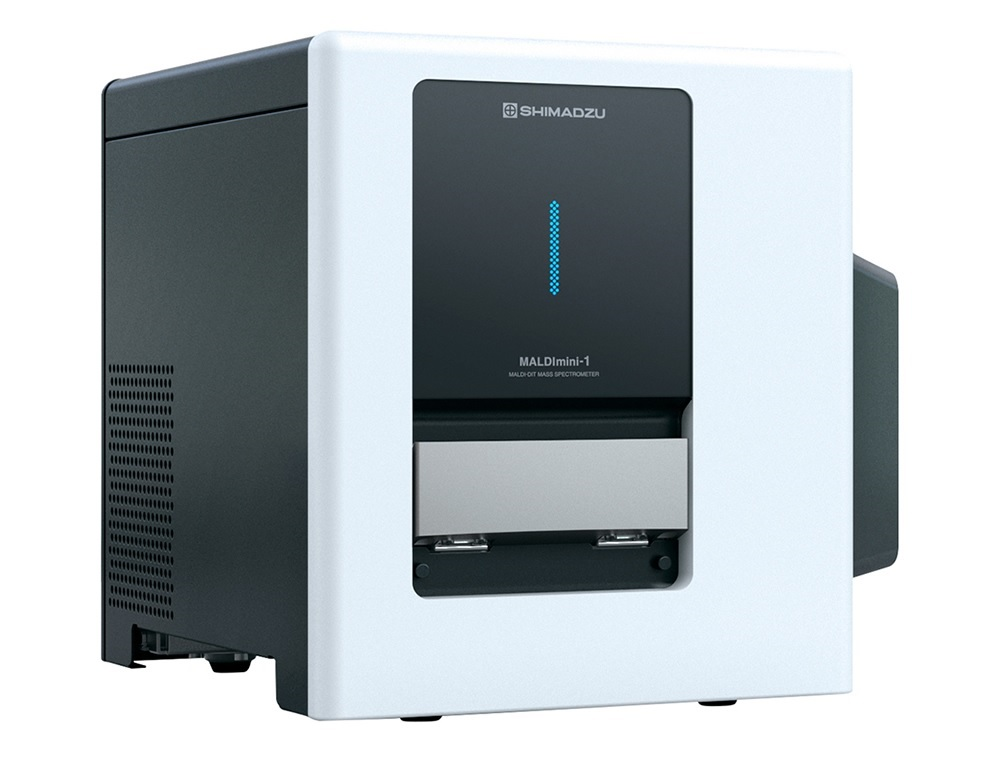
The Maldimini-1 digital ion trap mass spectrometer

Shimadzu Corp. released the MALDI digital ion trap mass spectrometer MALDImini-1 in 2019. Having a foot print of a A3 paper, the MALDI mass spectrometer covered an impressive mass range up to 70,000 Th and a MS^{n} mass rang to 5,000 Th. Tandem mass analysis function up to MS^{3} is available, which allows researchers to carry out comprehensive structural analyses, such as direct glycopeptide analysis, post translational modification analysis, and branched glycan structural analysis.
