= One-compartment kinetics =

Concept in chemistry

One-compartment kinetics for a chemical compound specifies that the uptake in the compartment is proportional to the concentration outside the compartment, and the elimination is proportional to the concentration inside the compartment. Both the compartment and the environment outside the compartment are considered to be homogeneous (well mixed).The compartment typically represents some organism (e.g. a fish or a daphnid).

This model is used in the simplest versions of the DEBtox method for the quantification of effects of toxicants.
