= Thomson (unit) =

Unit relating to the field of mass spectrometry

thomson
- Unit of: Mass-to-charge ratio
- Symbol: Th
- Named after: J. J. Thomson

The thomson (symbol: Th) is a unit that has appeared infrequently in scientific literature relating to the field of mass spectrometry as a unit of mass-to-charge ratio. The unit was proposed by R. Graham Cooks and Alan L. Rockwood naming it in honour of J. J. Thomson, who measured the mass-to-charge ratio of electrons and ions.

== Definition ==
The thomson is defined as

$$1~\mathrm{Th} = 1~\frac{\mathrm{Da}}{e} \approx 1.036426 \times 10^{-8}\,\mathrm{kg{\cdot}C^{-1}}$$

where Da is the symbol for the unit dalton (also called the unified atomic mass unit, symbol u), and e is the elementary charge, which is the unit of electric charge in the system of atomic units.

For example, the ion C_{7}H_{7}^{2+} has a mass of 91 Da. Its charge number is +2, and hence its charge is 2e. The ion will be observed at 45.5 Th in a mass spectrum.

The thomson allows for negative values for negatively charged ions. For example, the benzoate anion would be observed at −121 Th since the charge is −e.

== Use ==
The thomson has been used by some mass spectrometrists, for example Alexander Makarov—the inventor of the Orbitrap—in a scientific poster, and a 2015 presentation. Other uses of the thomson include papers, and (notably) one book. The journal Rapid Communications in Mass Spectrometry (in which the original article appeared) states that "the thomson (Th) may be used for such purposes as a unit of mass-to-charge ratio although it is not currently approved by IUPAP or IUPAC." Even so, the term has been called "controversial" by RCM's former editor-in-chief (in a review the Hoffman text cited above). The book, Mass Spectrometry Desk Reference, argues against the use of the thomson. However, the editor-in-chief of the Journal of the Mass Spectrometry Society of Japan has written an editorial in support of the thomson unit.

The thomson is not an SI unit, nor has it been defined by IUPAC.

Since 2013, the thomson is deprecated by IUPAC (Definitions of Terms Relating to Mass Spectrometry). Since 2014, Rapid Communications in Mass Spectrometry regards the thomson as a "term that should be avoided in mass spectrometry publications".
