= Ceramide synthase 1 =

Protein-coding gene in the species Homo sapiens

CERS1

Identifiers
- Aliases: CERS1, LAG1, LASS1, UOG1, EPM8, ceramide synthase 1, GDF1, GDF-1
- External IDs: OMIM: 606919; MGI: 2136690; GeneCards: CERS1
Enzyme activity
EC #	BRENDA	ExPASy	KEGG	MetaCyc
2.3.1.24	↗	↗	↗	↗
2.3.1.299	↗	↗	↗	↗

Gene location (Human)
Chr.	Chromosome 19 (human)
Band	19p13.11	Start	18,868,545 bp
Band	19p13.11	End	18,896,727 bp

Gene location (Mouse)
Chr.	Chromosome 8 (mouse)
Band	8|8 B3.3	Start	70,768,425 bp
Band	8|8 B3.3	End	70,784,242 bp
RNA expression pattern
Bgee	Human / Mouse (ortholog); Top expressed in: C1 segment; right frontal lobe; Brodmann area 9; cingulate gyrus; anterior cingulate cortex; amygdala; putamen; hypothalamus; nucleus accumbens; caudate nucleus / Top expressed in: striatum of neuraxis; hippocampus proper; superior frontal gyrus; primary visual cortex; olfactory bulb; hypothalamus; cerebellum; cerebellar cortex; quadriceps femoris muscle; skeletal muscle tissue; More reference expression data
BioGPS	n/a
Gene ontology
Molecular function	sphingosine N-acyltransferase activity; molecular function
Cellular component	Golgi apparatus; endoplasmic reticulum membrane; Golgi membrane; membrane; intracellular membrane-bounded organelle; integral component of membrane; endoplasmic reticulum
Biological process	cellular response to mycotoxin; cellular response to UV-A; cellular response to dithiothreitol; negative regulation of telomerase activity; lipid metabolism; ceramide biosynthetic process; sphingolipid biosynthetic process
Sources:Amigo / QuickGO
Orthologs
Databases	NCBI: entry; OMA: entry
Species	Human	Mouse
Entrez	10715	93898
Ensembl	ENSG00000223802	ENSMUSG00000087408
UniProt	P27544	P27545
RefSeq (mRNA)	NM_198207; NM_001290265; NM_021267	NM_138647
RefSeq (protein)	NP_001277194; NP_067090; NP_937850	NP_619588
Location (UCSC)	Chr 19: 18.87 – 18.9 Mb	Chr 8: 70.77 – 70.78 Mb
PubMed search
- Wikidata
View/Edit Human	View/Edit Mouse

Ceramide synthase 1 also known as LAG1 longevity assurance homolog 1 is an enzyme that in humans is encoded by the CERS1 gene.

== Function ==
This gene encodes a member of the bone morphogenetic protein (BMP) family and the TGF-beta superfamily. This group of proteins is characterized by a polybasic proteolytic processing site that is cleaved to produce a mature protein containing seven conserved cysteine residues. Members of this family are regulators of cell growth and differentiation in both embryonic and adult tissues. Studies in yeast suggest that the encoded protein is involved in aging. This protein is transcribed from a monocistronic mRNA as well as a bicistronic mRNA, which also encodes growth differentiation factor 1.

Ceramide synthase 1 (CerS1) is a ceramide synthase that catalyzes the synthesis of C18 ceramide in a fumonisin B1-independent manner, and is primarily expressed in the brain. It can also be found in low levels in skeletal muscle and the testis. Within the cell, CerS1 is located in the endoplasmic reticulum (ER) and golgi apparatus membrane. CerS1 has two isoforms and isoform 1 may recycle from the golgi to the ER.

CerS1/GDF1 mRNA is strongly expressed in muscle and brain, and was also found in heart and lung. Within the brain, CerS1 is the primary CerS expressed in most neurons. In white matter, it can only be found in low levels.

In an experiment performed in mice in 2012, ablation of neuronal CerS1 decreased levels of sphingolipids, hexosylceramides, and sphingomyelin. Although the brains in these mice appeared to develop normally, researchers observed atrophy of the cerebellum, and Purkinje neurons appeared to degenerate. Granule cells also showed a 6 times increased rate of apoptosis. Behaviorally, the mice expressed motor and neurophysiological impairment.

== Structure ==
Unlike other mammalian ceramides, CerS1 does not appear to have a Hox-like domain. It is functionally and structurally distinct from other CerS and is found in an entirely different branch of the phylogenetic tree.

== Clinical significance ==
On application of various stresses, CerS1 turns over rapidly by ubiquitination and proteasomal degradation, suggesting that it has a short half life.

It has been suggested that CerS1 is involved with the regulation of the growth of head and neck squamous cell carcinoma (HNSCC), based on the information that C18 ceramide levels are lower in HNSCC tissues than in normal tissue. CerS1, in particular amongst other CerS, has also been shown to sensitize cells to chemotherapeutic drugs, such as cisplatin, carboplatin, doxorubicin, and vincristine.
