= Ion trap =

Device for trapping charged particles

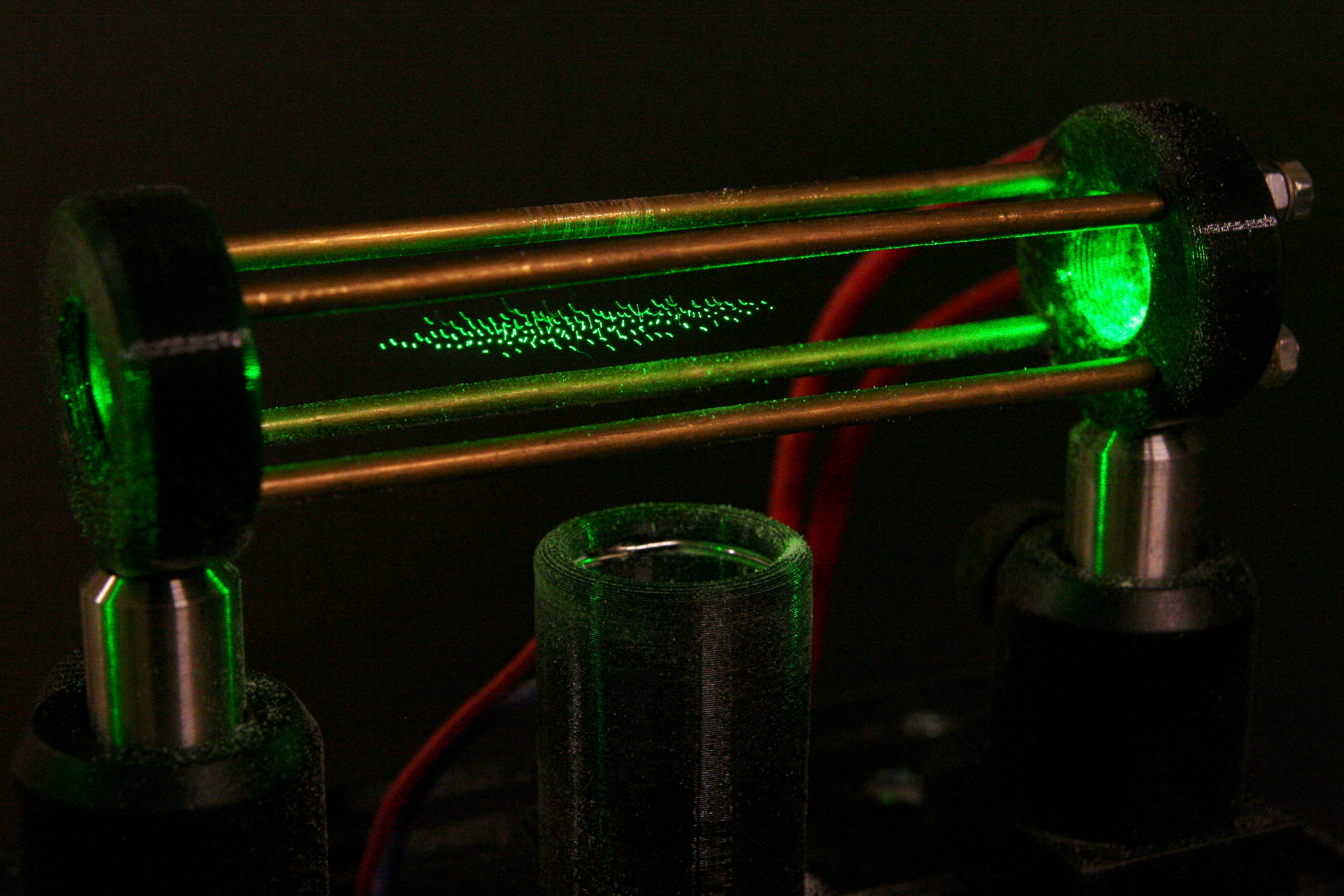
Charged flour grains held in a Paul ion trap. The grains are glowing under the illumination green light (this does not affect trapping). Their motion during the exposure time is evident in the streaks that the grains made during the photograph.

An ion trap consists of electrodes that produce electric fields to trap ions (charged particles), which may be atoms, molecules, or large particles such as dust. Ion traps have a number of applications including mass spectrometry, atomic frequency standards, and quantum computing. In comparison to neutral atom traps, ion traps have deeper trapping potentials (up to several electronvolts) that are agnostic to the internal structure of the ions. The two most popular ion traps are the Paul trap which uses static and oscillating electric fields and the Penning trap, which uses a static electric field and static magnetic field. Paul traps are used in trapped ion quantum computers and realizing atomic clocks, including the most precise instrument humankind has ever made. Penning traps are powerful tools for mass spectrometry and measuring magnetic dipole moments.

== History ==
The physical principles of ion traps were first explored by F. M. Penning, who observed that electrons released by the cathode of an ionization vacuum gauge follow a long cycloidal path to the anode in the presence of a sufficiently strong magnetic field. Later Wolfgang Paul developed a method to trap ions without magnetic fields that was based on his work with quadrupole mass spectrometers. For this work he shared the 1989 Nobel Prize in Physics.

Ion traps were used in television receivers prior to the introduction of aluminized CRT faces around 1958, to protect the phosphor screen from ions. The ion trap must be delicately adjusted for maximum brightness.

== General theory ==
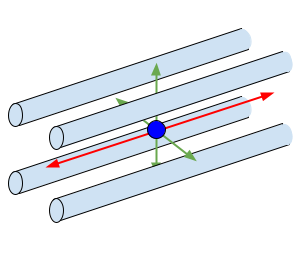
A schematic of a linear Paul trap with the three axes of motion depicted by arrows. Endcap electrodes (not shown) generate a trapping potential along the axial direction (red arrow). A radio frequency electric field is applied to the four rods which confines the ion in the two radial directions (green arrows).

A trap requires confining forces in all three spatial directions. Electric and magnetic fields exert forces on ions, called the Lorentz force. Due to Earnshaw's theorem it is not possible to confine an ion using only static electric fields. However, a static magnetic and electric field (a Penning trap), or the combination of an oscillating electric field with a static electric field (a Paul trap), can trap ions. The confining fields and the resulting motion of ions in a trap are generally decomposed into one axial and two radial components with respect to the trap geometry. In both Paul and Penning traps, a static electric field provides the axial confinement. Paul traps confine the ion radially with an oscillating electric field whereas Penning traps use a static magnetic field.

== Types ==
=== Paul trap ===
Named after its inventor Wolfgang Paul, a Paul trap (also known as a quadrupole ion trap) uses static direct current (DC) and radio frequency (RF) oscillating electric fields to trap ions. Paul traps are commonly used as components of mass spectrometers.

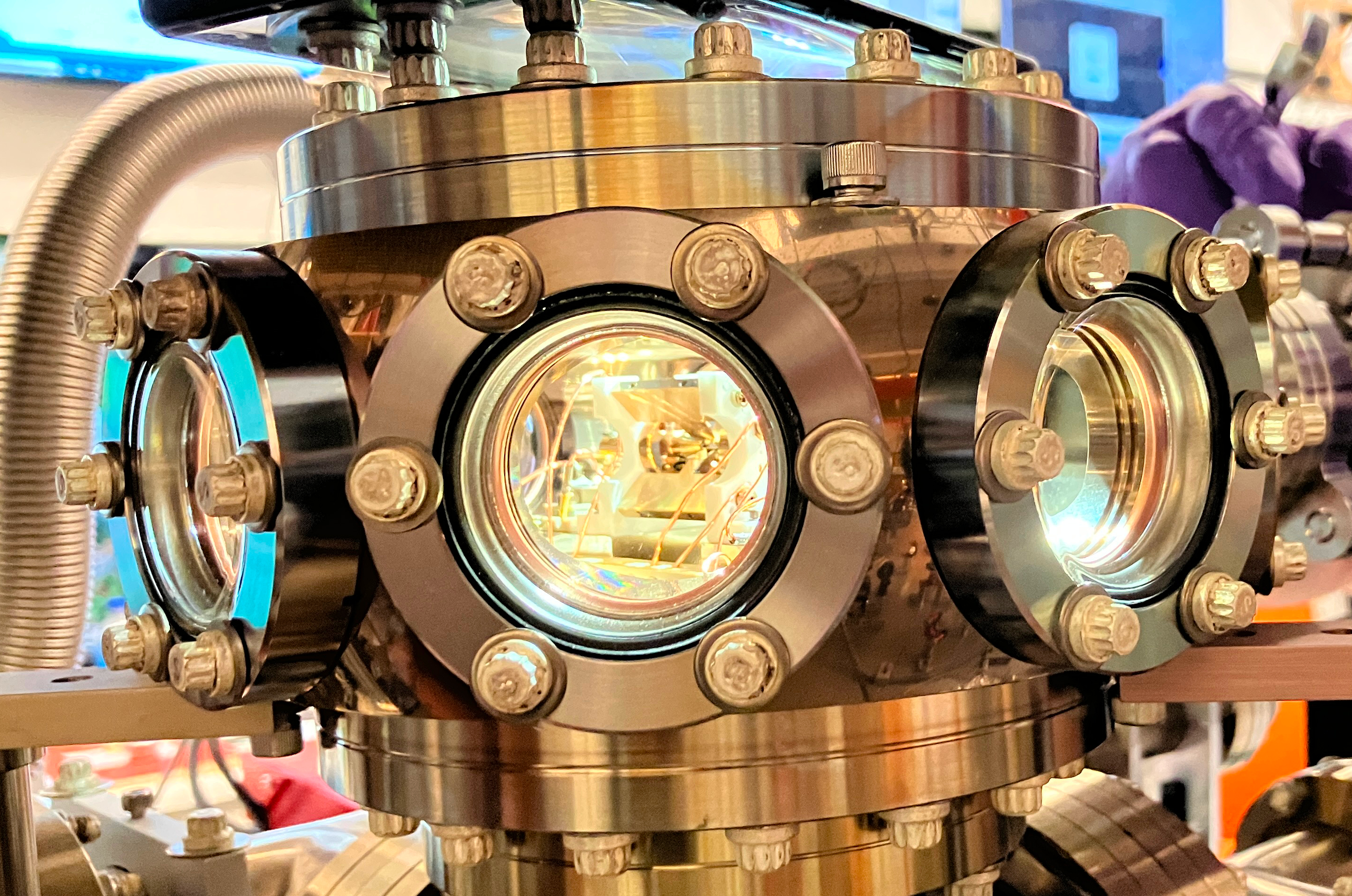
A Linear Paul ion trap, used for precision measurements of radium ions, inside a vacuum chamber. Viewports surrounding the chamber allow laser light to be directed into the trap center.

The RF field generates an average confining force in two dimensions with an oscillating quadrupole potential. Since the field affects the acceleration, a trapped particle's position lags behind by half a period. The confining and anti-confining directions of the potential are switched faster than the time it takes for an ion to escape.

The quadrupole is the simplest electric field geometry used in such traps, though more complicated geometries are possible and used in specialized devices. The electric fields are generated from electric potentials on metal electrodes. A pure quadrupole is created from hyperbolic electrodes, though cylindrical electrodes are often used for ease of fabrication. Microfabricated chip traps exist where the electrodes lie in a plane with the trapping region above the plane. A segmented linear paul trap has been designed with both DC and RF electrodes on four layers of chips, where the trapping regions (multiple) are situated in a cuboidal cutout in the center of the four chips. There are two main classes of traps, depending on whether the oscillating field provides confinement in three or two dimensions. In the two-dimension case (a so-called "linear RF trap"), confinement in the third direction is provided by static electric fields.

=== Penning trap ===
A standard configuration for a Penning trap consists of a ring electrode and two end caps. A static voltage differential between the ring and end caps confines ions along the axial direction (between end caps). However, as expected from Earnshaw's theorem, the static electric potential is not sufficient to trap an ion in all three dimensions. To provide the radial confinement, a strong axial magnetic field is applied.

== Theory ==
=== Paul trap ===
Radial confinement of an ion in a Paul trap with oscillating electric fields. The figure on the left shows the oscillating electric field generated by the two pairs of electrodes, and the figure on the right shows the potential energy surface.

A typical trap configuration has four parallel electrodes along the $z$-axis that are positioned at the corners of a square in the $xy$-plane. Diagonally opposite electrodes are connected and a voltage $V = V_0\sin(\Omega t)$ is applied. The electric field produced by this potential is $\mathbf{E} = \mathbf{E}_0\sin(\Omega t)$. The force on an ion of charge $e$ is $\mathbf{F} = e\mathbf{E}$ which with ion mass $M$ leads to the radial equation of motion

$M\mathbf{\ddot{r}} = e\mathbf{E}_0\sin(\Omega t) \!$ .

If the ion is initially at rest, two successive integrations give the velocity and displacement as

$$\mathbf{\dot{r}} = \frac{e\mathbf{E}_0}{M\Omega}\cos(\Omega t) \!$$,

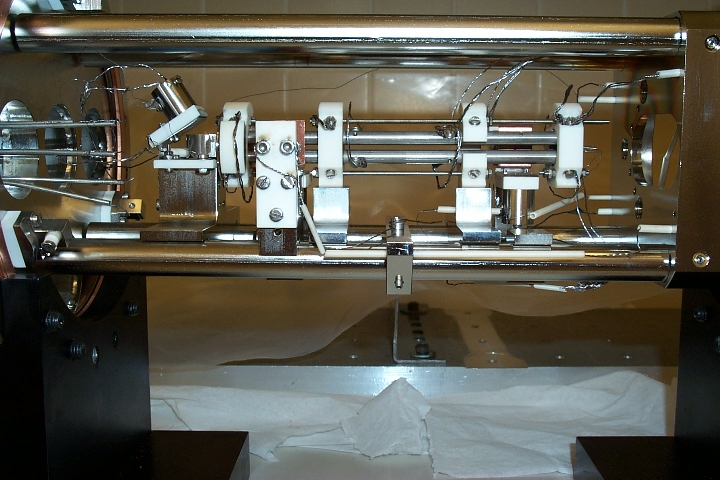
Linear Paul Trap at the University of Calgary

$$\mathbf{r} = \mathbf{r}_0 - \frac{e\mathbf{E}_0}{M\Omega^2}\sin(\Omega t) \!$$,

where $\mathbf{r}_0$ is a constant of integration and corresponding to an arbitrary starting position. Thus, the ion oscillates with angular frequency $\Omega$ and amplitude proportional to the electric field strength and is confined radially.

Working specifically with a linear Paul trap, we can write more specific equations of motion. Along the $z$-axis, an analysis of the radial symmetry yields a potential

$$\phi = \alpha + \beta(x^2 - y^2) \!$$.

The constants $\alpha$ and $\beta$ are determined by boundary conditions on the electrodes and $\phi$ satisfies Laplace's equation $\nabla^2\phi = 0$. Assuming the length of the electrodes $r$ is much greater than their separation $r_0$, it can be shown that

$$\phi = \phi_0 + \frac{V_0}{2r_0^2}\cos(\Omega t)(x^2 - y^2) \!$$.

Since the electric field is given by the gradient of the potential, we get that

$$\mathbf{E} = -\frac{V_0}{r_0^2}\cos(\Omega t)(x\mathbf{\hat{e}}_x - y\mathbf{\hat{e}}_y) \!$$.

Defining $\tau = \Omega t/2$, the equations of motion in the $xy$-plane are a simplified form of the Mathieu equation,

$$\frac{d^2x_i}{d\tau^2} = -\frac{4eV_0}{Mr_0^2\Omega^2}\cos(2\tau)x_i \!$$.

=== Equations of motion ===
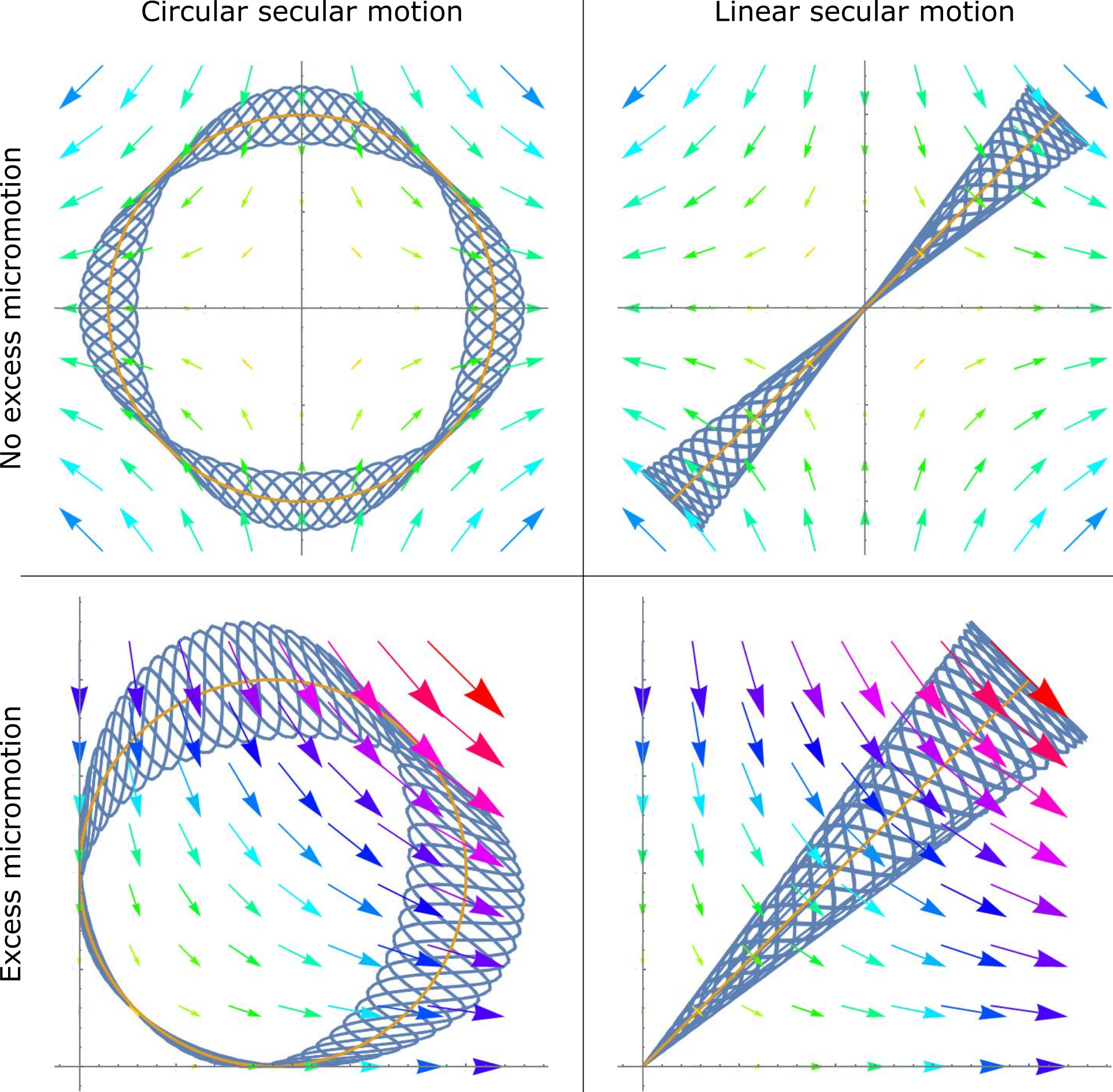
Classical trajectory of a trapped ion in a radiofrequency (rf) quadrupole (Paul) trap. A quadrupole electric field is displayed for reference. The blue line represents the ion path in the transversal (or radial) direction of a linear trap. The orange line is the secular motion. A linear or a circular secular motion can be generated depending on the initial conditions. Micromotion is the fast oscillation around the secular motion, which is enhanced when a stray dc electric field pushes the ion away from the center of the trap, (here located at the intersection of the axes).

Ions in a quadrupole field experience restoring forces that drive them back toward the center of the trap. The motion of the ions in the field is described by solutions to the Mathieu equation. When written for ion motion in a trap, the equation is

| $\frac{d^2u}{d\xi^2}+[a_u-2q_u\cos (2\xi) ]u = 0$ | 1 |

where $u$ represents the x, y and z coordinates, $\xi$ is a dimensionless variable given by $\xi = \Omega t / 2$, and $a_u\,$ and $q_u$ are dimensionless trapping parameters. The parameter $\Omega$ is the radial frequency of the potential applied to the ring electrode. By using the chain rule, it can be shown that

| $\frac{d^2u}{dt^2} = \frac{\Omega^2}{4} \frac{d^2u}{d\xi^2}$ | 2 |

Substituting Equation 2 into the Mathieu Equation 1 yields

| $\frac{4}{\Omega^2}\frac{d^2u}{dt^2} + \left[a_u - 2q_u\cos (\Omega t) \right]u = 0 .$ | 3 |

Multiplying by m and rearranging terms shows us that

| $m \frac{d^2u}{dt^2} + m \frac{\Omega^2}{4}\left[a_u - 2q_u\cos (\Omega t) \right]u = 0 .$ | 4 |

By Newton's laws of motion, the above equation represents the force on the ion. This equation can be exactly solved using the Floquet theorem or the standard techniques of multiple scale analysis. The particle dynamics and time averaged density of charged particles in a Paul trap can also be obtained by the concept of ponderomotive force. In this case, the average trajectory is called "secular motion", and is superimposed by an oscillation at frequency $\Omega$ but with small amplitude called "micromotion".

The forces in each dimension are not coupled, thus the force acting on an ion in, for example, the x dimension is

| $F_x = ma = m\frac{d^2x}{dt^2} = -e \frac{\partial \phi}{\partial x}$ | 5 |

Here, $\phi$ is the quadrupolar potential, given by

| $\phi = \frac{\phi_0}{r_0^2} \bigl( \lambda x^2 + \sigma y^2 + \gamma z^2 \bigr)$ | 6 |

where $\phi _0$ is the applied electric potential and $\lambda$, $\sigma$, and $\gamma$ are weighting factors, and $r_0$ is a size parameter constant. In order to satisfy Laplace's equation, $\nabla^2\phi_0 = 0$, it can be shown that

$$\lambda + \sigma + \gamma = 0 \, .$$

For an ion trap, $\lambda = \sigma = 1$ and $\gamma = -2$ and for a quadrupole mass filter, $\lambda = -\sigma = 1$ and $\gamma = 0$.

Transforming equation 6 into a cylindrical coordinate system with $x = r \cos\theta$, $y = r \sin\theta$, and $z = z$ and applying the Pythagorean trigonometric identity $\sin^2 \theta + \cos^2 \theta = 1$ gives

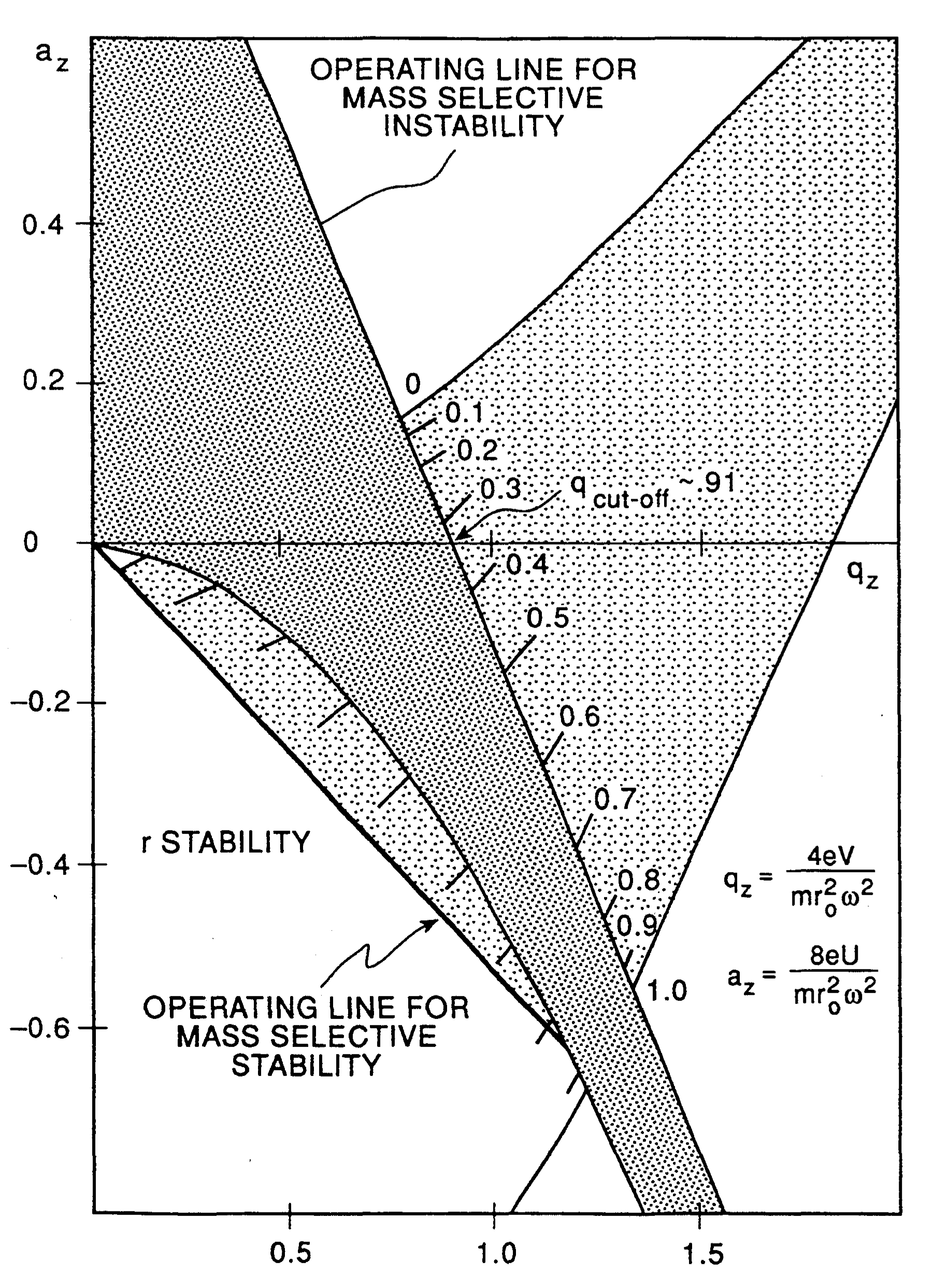
Diagram of the stability regions of a quadrupole ion trap according to the voltage and frequency applied to the ion trap elements.

| $\phi_{r,z} = \frac{\phi_0}{r_0^2} \big( r^2 - 2z^2 \big) .$ | 7 |

The applied electric potential is a combination of RF and DC given by

| $\phi_0 = U + V\cos \Omega t .$ | 8 |

where $\Omega = 2\pi \nu$ and $\nu$ is the applied frequency in hertz.

Substituting Equation 8 into Equation 6 with $\lambda = 1$ gives

| $\frac{\partial \phi}{\partial x} = \frac {2x}{r_0^2} \big( U + V\cos \Omega t \big) .$ | 9 |

Substituting equation 9 into equation 5 leads to

| $m\frac {d^2x}{dt^2} = - \frac {2e}{r_0^2} \big( U + V\cos \Omega t \big) x .$ | 10 |

Comparing terms on the right hand side of equation 1 and equation 10 leads to

| $a_x = \frac {8eU} {m r_0^2 \Omega^2}$ | 11 |

and

| $q_x = - \frac {4eV} {m r_0^2 \Omega^2} .$ | 12 |

Further $q_x = q_y\,$,

| $a_z = -\frac {16eU} {m r_0^2 \Omega^2}$ | 13 |

and

| $q_z = \frac {8eV} {m r_0^2 \Omega^2} .$ | 14 |

The trapping of ions can be understood in terms of stability regions in $q_u$ and $a_u$ space. The boundaries of the shaded regions in the figure are the boundaries of stability in the two directions (also known as boundaries of bands). The domain of overlap of the two regions is the trapping domain. For calculation of these boundaries and similar diagrams as above see Müller-Kirsten.

=== Penning trap ===
The radial trajectory of an ion in a Penning trap; the ratio of cyclotron frequency to magnetron frequency is $\omega_c/\omega_m = 10/1$.

For a uniform electric field $\mathbf{E} = E\mathbf{\hat{e}}_x$, the force $\mathbf{F} = e\mathbf{E}$ accelerates a positively charged ion along the $x$-axis. For a uniform magnetic field $\mathbf{B}= B\mathbf{\hat{e}}_z$, the Lorentz force causes the ion to move in circular motion with cyclotron frequency

$$\omega_c = \frac{eB}{M} \!$$.

Assuming an ion with zero initial velocity placed in a region with $\mathbf{E} = E\mathbf{\hat{e}}_x$ and $\mathbf{B}= B\mathbf{\hat{e}}_z$, the equations of motion are

$$x = \frac{E}{\omega_c B}(1-\cos(\omega_c t)) \!$$,
$$y = -\frac{E}{\omega_c B}(\omega_c t-\sin(\omega_c t)) \!$$,
$$z = 0 \!$$.

The resulting motion is a combination of oscillatory motion around the $z$-axis with frequency $\omega_c$ and a drift velocity in the $y$-direction. The drift velocity is perpendicular to the direction of the electric field.

For the radial electric field produced by the electrodes in a Penning trap, the drift velocity will precess around the axial direction with some frequency $\omega_m$, called the magnetron frequency. An ion will also have a third characteristic frequency $\omega_z$ between the two end cap electrodes. The frequencies usually have widely different values with $\omega_z \ll \omega_m< \ll \omega_c$.

=== Auto-ponderomotive guide ===
An auto-ponderomotive guide is an electrostatic counterpart to a Paul trap. The electron beam is directed into an area of segmented electrodes with alternating negative and positive static voltages placed at half a periodicity $\left(\frac{L_p}{2}\right)$. In the frame of the moving charged particles the static potentials appear to be an undulating field with driving micromotion frequency $\Omega = 2 \pi \frac{v_z}{L_p}$. This generates a periodic restoring force that confines the beam in the two spatial directions orthogonal to the direction of propagation. The technique can be implemented using photolithography; two chips created by that technique placed face to face separated by 1 mm create an electron trap.

== Ion trap mass spectrometers ==
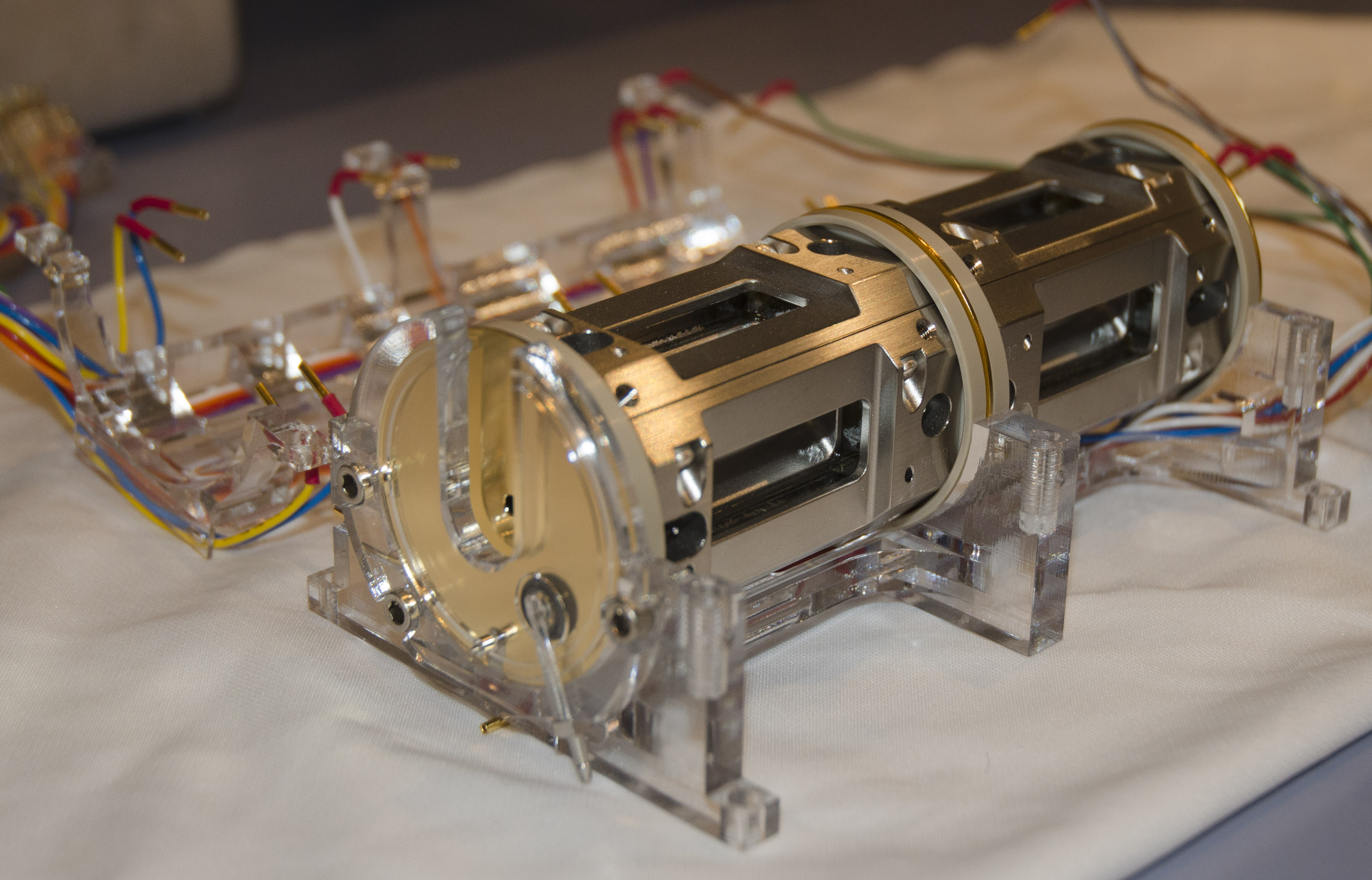
A linear ion trap which is part of a mass spectrometer

An ion trap mass spectrometer may incorporate a Penning trap (Fourier-transform ion cyclotron resonance), Paul trap or the Kingdon trap. The Orbitrap, introduced in 2005, is based on the Kingdon trap. Other types of mass spectrometers may also use a linear quadrupole ion trap as a selective mass filter.

=== Penning ion trap ===
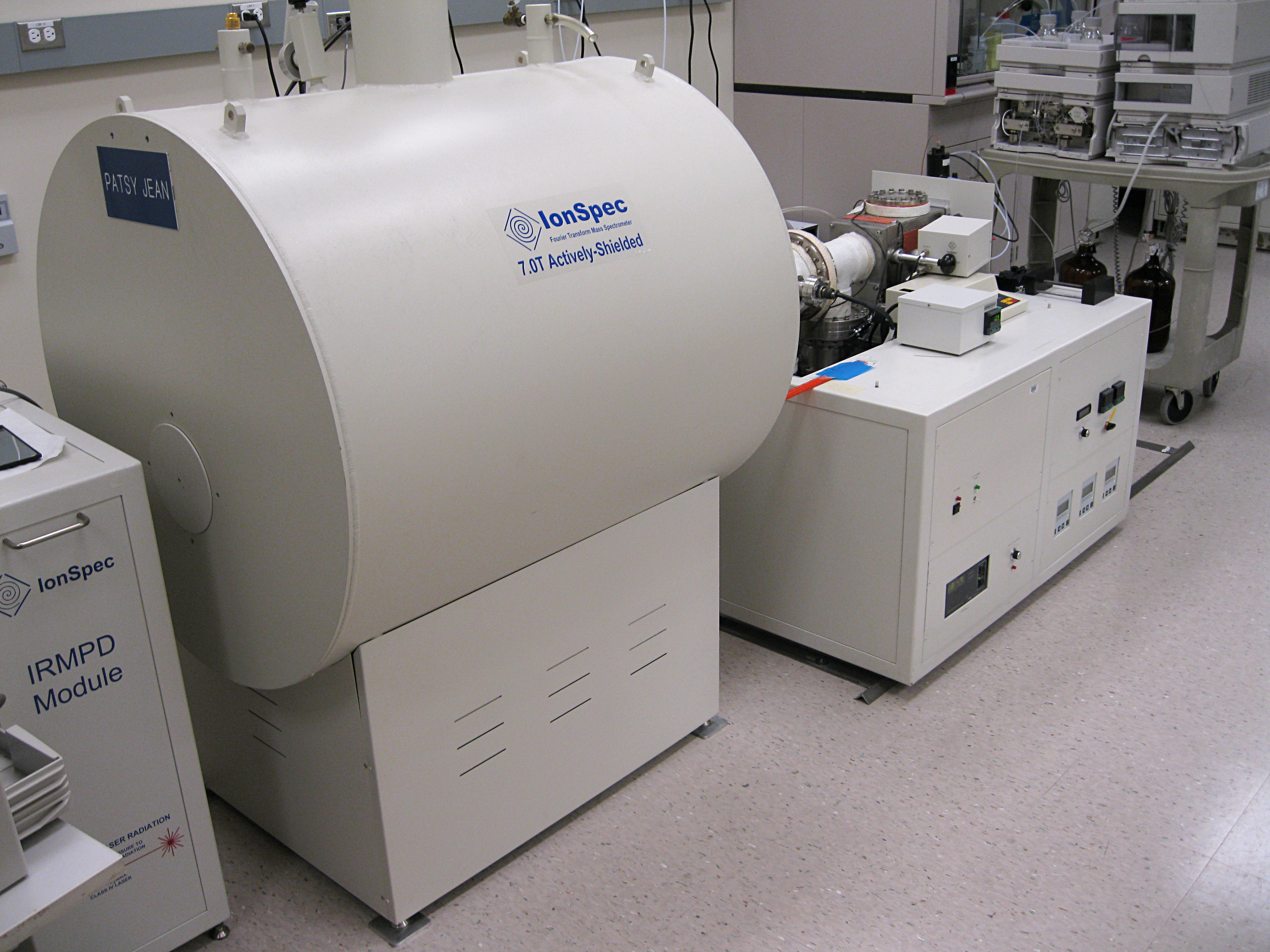
FTICR mass spectrometer – an example of a Penning trap instrument

A Penning trap stores charged particles using a strong homogeneous axial magnetic field to confine particles radially and a quadrupole electric field to confine the particles axially. Penning traps are well suited for measurements of the properties of ions and stable charged subatomic particles. Precision studies of the electron magnetic moment by Dehmelt and others are an important topic in modern physics.

Penning traps can be used in quantum computation and quantum information processing and are used at CERN to store antimatter. Penning traps form the basis of Fourier-transform ion cyclotron resonance mass spectrometry for determining the mass-to-charge ratio of ions.

The Penning Trap was invented by Frans Michel Penning and Hans Georg Dehmelt, who built the first trap in the 1950s.

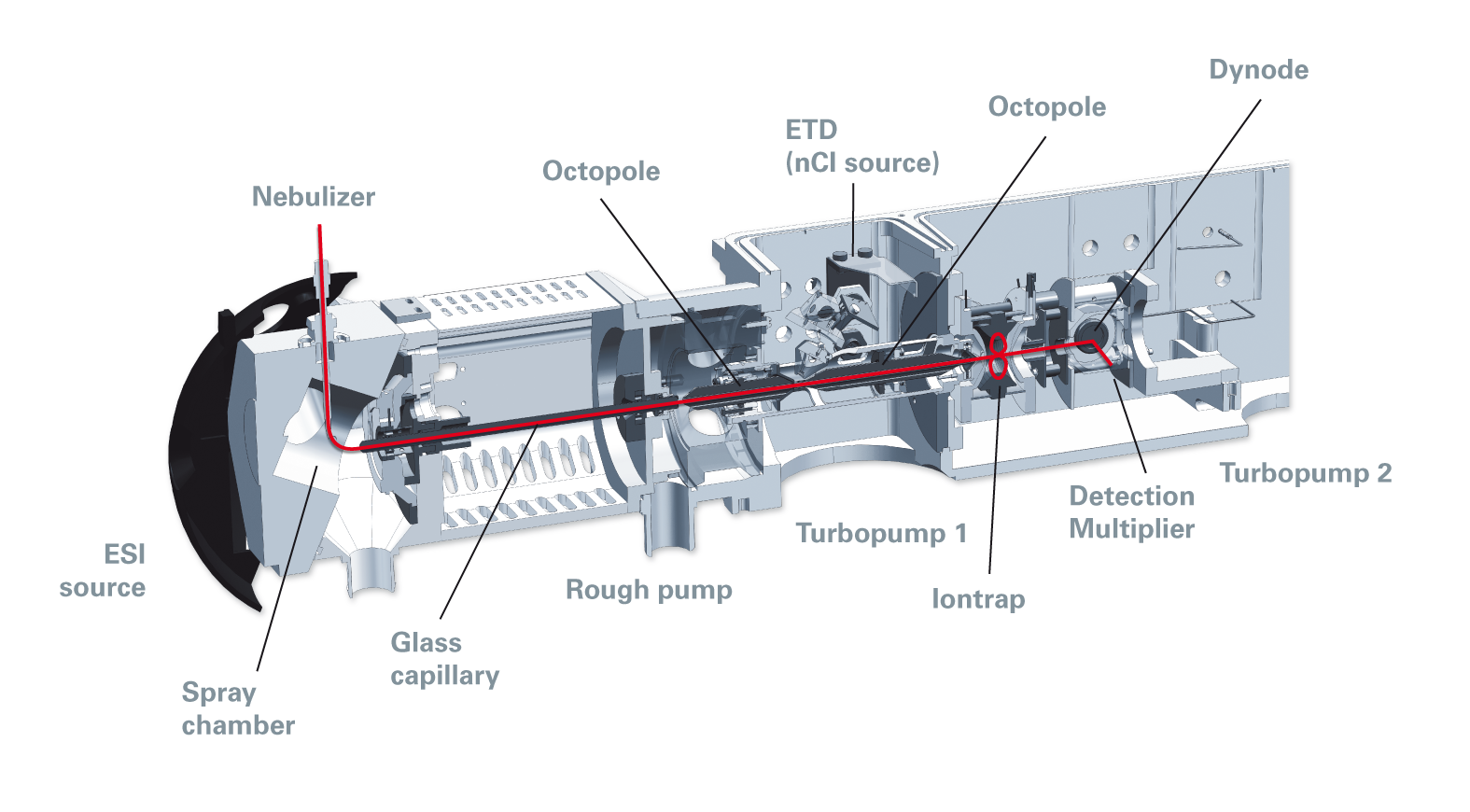
Schematic diagram of ion trap mass spectrometer with an electrospray ionization (ESI) source and Paul ion trap.

=== Kingdon trap and orbitrap ===
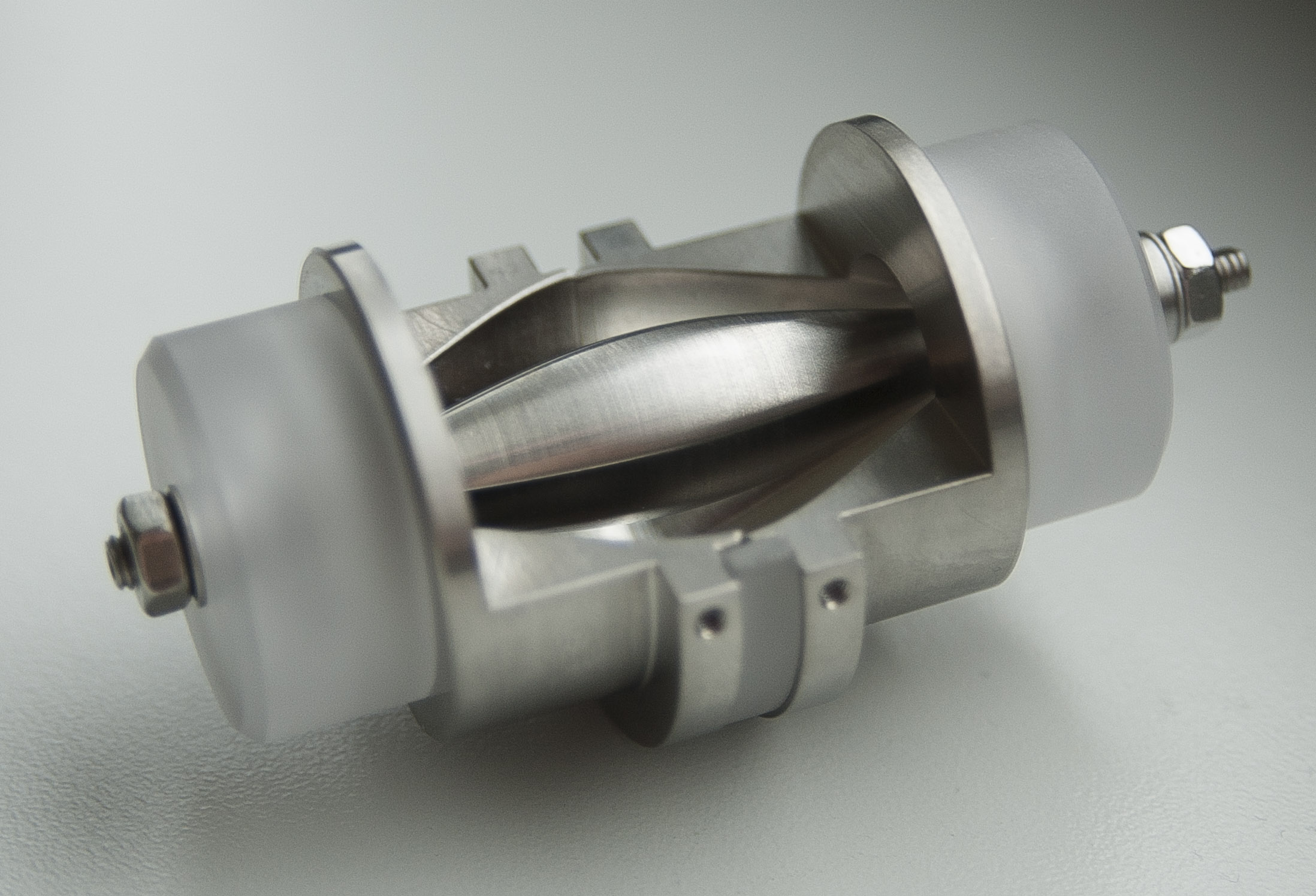
Partial cross-section of Orbitrap mass analyzer – an example of a Kingdon trap.

A Kingdon trap consists of a thin central wire, an outer cylindrical electrode and isolated end cap electrodes at both ends. A static applied voltage results in a radial logarithmic potential between the electrodes. In a Kingdon trap there is no potential minimum to store the ions; however, they are stored with a finite angular momentum about the central wire and the applied electric field in the device allows for the stability of the ion trajectories. In 1981, Knight introduced a modified outer electrode that included an axial quadrupole term that confines the ions on the trap axis. The dynamic Kingdon trap has an additional AC voltage that uses strong defocusing to permanently store charged particles. The dynamic Kingdon trap does not require the trapped ions to have angular momentum with respect to the filament. An Orbitrap is a modified Kingdon trap that is used for mass spectrometry. Though the idea has been suggested and computer simulations performed neither the Kingdon nor the Knight configurations were reported to produce mass spectra, as the simulations indicated mass resolving power would be problematic.

=== Digital ion trap ===
The digital ion trap (DIT) is a quadrupole ion trap (linear or 3D) that differs from conventional traps by the driving waveform. A DIT is driven by digital signals, typically rectangular waveforms that are generated by switching rapidly between discrete voltage levels. Major advantages of the DIT are its versatility and virtually unlimited mass range. The digital ion trap has been developed mainly as a mass analyzer.

== See also ==
- Mass spectrometry
- Trapped ion quantum computer
- Laser cooling
- Quantum jump
