= DIT University =

University in Dehradun, Uttarakhand, India

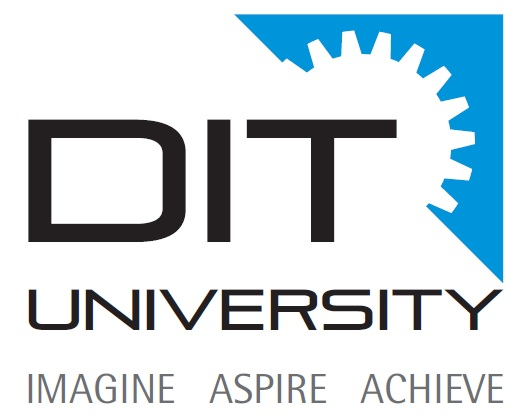
- Motto: Imagine Aspire Achieve
- Type: Private
- Established: 1998
- Affiliations: UGC
- Vice-Chancellor: G. Raghurama
- President: Anuj Aggarwal
- Location: Dehradun, Uttarakhand, India; 30.3992°N 78.0753°E
- Website: www.dituniversity.edu.in

DIT University (erstwhile Dehradun Institute of Technology) is a private university in Dehradun, Uttarakhand, India. DIT University has been accorded by the National Assessment and Accreditation Council with Grade A.

== Campus ==
DIT University's campus is located in Dehradun, in the foothills of Mussoorie. Dehradun is 240 kilometres northeast of Delhi. The area of the campus is 25 acres out of which 23 acres is developed, the prominent buildings are Vedanta, Chanakya and Civil block. There is a two acre ground available for students, parking, and other facilities are also available in DIT. The campus has classrooms equipped with ICT facilities, including projectors, screens, and other technological tools.

== Academics ==
=== Academic programmes ===
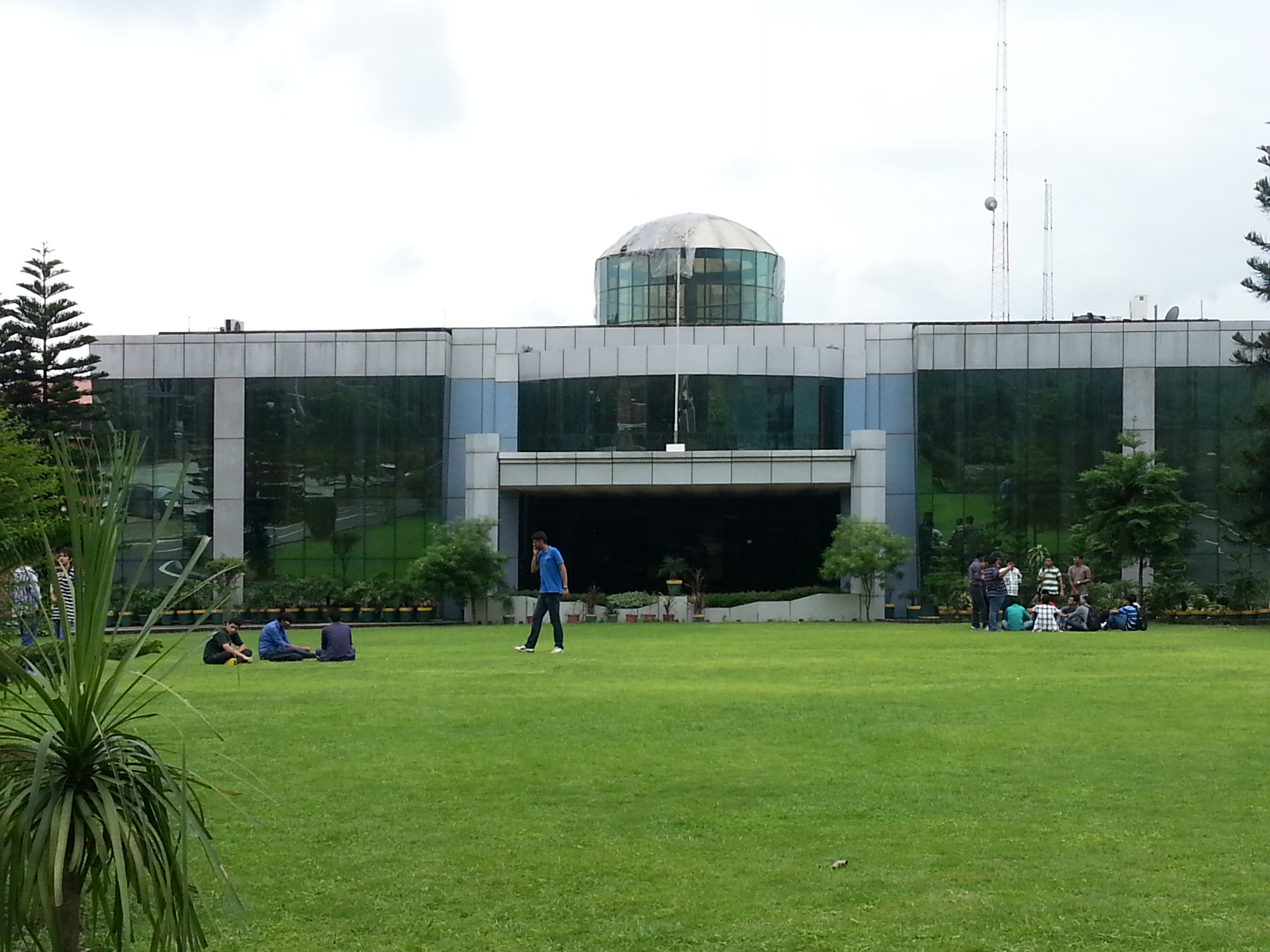
Administrative Building of DIT University

DIT University has programs in Engineering, Architecture, Pharmacy, Management Studies, Computing.

== Rankings ==
University rankings

Engineering – India
- NIRF (2024): 201-300

The National Institutional Ranking Framework (NIRF) ranked the university between 201-300 in the engineering rankings in 2024.

== Student life ==
=== Events ===
==== Youthopia ====
Youthopia is the annual cultural and technical inter-college festival of DITU. The prominent events include Battle of Bands, RoboWars, CodeHunt and Perceptrix.

==== Sphurti ====
Sphurti is the annual dance competition at the DITU campus. DITU invites colleges throughout India to participate in events including cricket, basketball, football, volleyball, track and field, badminton, table tennis. Since the first Sphurti, there are more than 69 colleges that have come to participate in Sphurti.

==== Vision 2k35 ====
Aiming to promote Dr. A. P. J. Abdul Kalam's vision of an era when the youth of India would enrich the world with their social, technical and academic brilliance, Vision 2K35 is a DIT University's initiative, to reach out to Young India. Vision 2K35 is a national level youth summit wherein, students will explore and evaluate the potential of renewable and conserving energy infrastructure for the nation by implementing most innovative Technical Ideas, Energy Auditing & Audit Presentation. The theme of the summit is what role the youth can play in bringing India in the league of Superpowers by 2035.
