= Sphingosine N-acyltransferase =

sphingosine N-acyltransferase

Identifiers
- EC no.: 2.3.1.24
- CAS no.: 37257-09-3

Databases
- BRENDA: enzyme data
- ExPASy: NiceZyme view
- KEGG: enzyme entry
- MetaCyc: metabolic pathway
- Rhea: reactions
- PDB structures: RCSB PDB PDBe PDBsum
- Gene Ontology: AmiGO / QuickGO
Search
- PMC: articles
- PubMed: articles
- NCBI: proteins

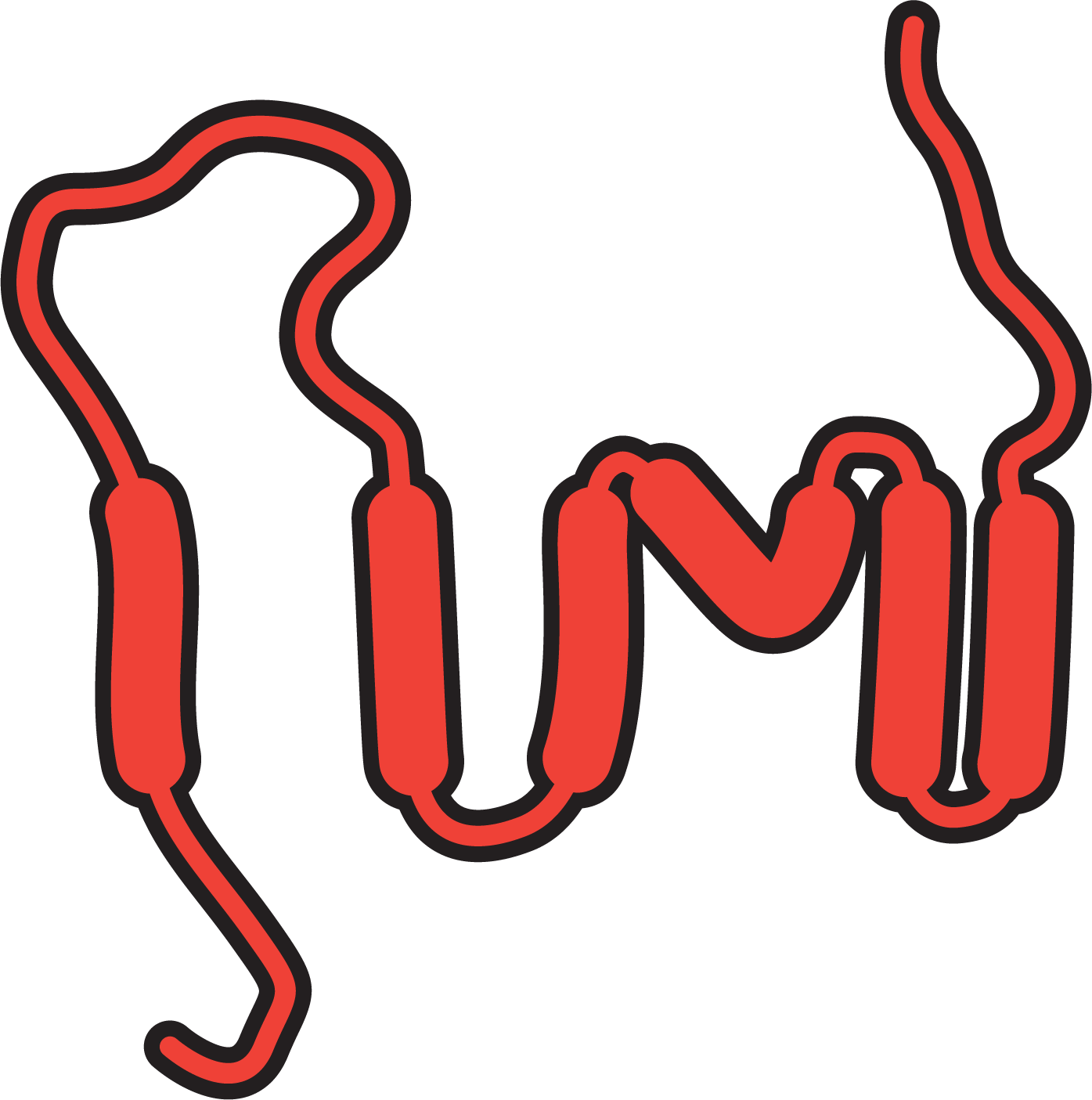

In enzymology, sphingosine N-acyltransferases (ceramide synthases (CerS), EC 2.3.1.24) are enzymes that catalyze the chemical reaction of synthesis of ceramide:

acyl-CoA + sphingosine $\rightleftharpoons$ CoA + N-acylsphingosine

Thus, the two substrates of this enzyme are acyl-CoA and sphingosine, whereas its two products are CoA and N-acylsphingosine.

Ceramide synthases are integral membrane proteins of the endoplasmic reticulum.

This enzyme belongs to the family of transferases, specifically those acyltransferases transferring groups other than aminoacyl groups. The systematic name of this enzyme class is acyl-CoA:sphingosine N-acyltransferase. Other names in common use include ceramide synthetase, and sphingosine acyltransferase. This enzyme participates in sphingolipid metabolism.

== History ==
CerS were originally called Lass (Longevity assurance) genes because of their homology to the yeast protein, longevity assurance gene-1 (LAG1p), and they were later renamed due to the discovery of their biological function.

LAG1 in yeast was discovered in 1994 and named for the discovery that its deletion prolonged life span of Saccharomyces cerevisiae by almost 50%. In the following years, it and its homologs were shown to be required for the syntheses of ceramides found in yeast. Three years previously, the mammalian gene upstream of growth and differentiation factor-1 (UOG-1) was discovered, but it wasn't until 2005 that it was defined as the first mammalian CerS, when Sujoy Lahiri and Tony Futerman from the Weizmann Institute of Science found that LASS5 is a bona fide mammalian ceramide synthase that specifically synthesizes palmitoyl (C16) ceramide.

== Function ==
CerS are involved in the de novo synthesis pathway of ceramides. Their role is acylation coupling of sphinganine to a long-chain fatty acid to form a dihydroceramide, before the double bond is introduced to position 4 of the sphingoid base.

== Genetic Characteristics ==
CerS contain a unique C-terminal domain called the TLC domain and both mammalian and yeast CerS have 5–8 transmembrane domains. All mammalian CerS, aside from CerS1, contain a Hox-like domain shared by transcription factors important in development, although the first 15 amino acids of this domain are missing in CerS, indicating that this domain likely does not function as a genuine transcription factor.

== Mammalian CerS ==
Six mammalian CerS have been described, with each utilizing fatty acyl CoAs of relatively defined chain lengths for N‑acylation of the sphingoid long chain base. Mammals contain six distinct CerS, whereas most other enzymes in the sphingolipid biosynthetic pathway only occur in one or two isoforms.

Ceramide synthases include:

- Ceramide synthase 1
- Ceramide synthase 2
- Ceramide synthase 3
- Ceramide synthase 4
- Ceramide synthase 5
- Ceramide synthase 6
