= Fumonisin B1 =

- Fumonisin B1

Names
- Preferred IUPAC name (2S,2′S)-2,2′-[(5S,6R,7R,9R,11S,16R,18S,19S)-19-Amino-11,16,18-trihydroxy-5,9-dimethylicosane-6,7-diyl]bis[oxy(2-oxoethane-2,1-diyl)]dibutanedioic acid
- Other names Macrofusine

Identifiers
CAS Number	116355-83-0
3D model (JSmol)	Interactive image
ChEMBL	ChEMBL91690
ChemSpider	3313
ECHA InfoCard	100.150.289
EC Number	621-436-3
KEGG	C19241
PubChem CID	62314
UNII	3ZZM97XZ32
CompTox Dashboard (EPA)	DTXSID6020644
- InChI: InChI=1S/C34H59NO15/c1-5-6-9-20(3)32(50-31(44)17-23(34(47)48)15-29(41)42)27(49-30(43)16-22(33(45)46)14-28(39)40)13-19(2)12-24(36)10-7-8-11-25(37)18-26(38)21(4)35/h19-27,32,36-38H,5-18,35H2,1-4H3,(H,39,40)(H,41,42)(H,45,46)(H,47,48)/t19-,20+,21+,22+,23+,24+,25-,26+,27-,32-/m1/s1 Key: UVBUBMSSQKOIBE-ZWKVXHQASA-N
- SMILES: CCCCC(C)C(C(CC(C)CC(CCCCC(CC(C(C)N)O)O)O)OC(=O)CC(CC(=O)O)C(=O)O)OC(=O)CC(CC(=O)O)C(=O)O

Properties
Chemical formula	C_{34}H_{59}NO_{15}
Molar mass	721.838 g·mol^{−1}
Appearance	White to off-white powder

Hazards
- GHS labelling
Pictograms	(GHS08: Health hazard)
Signal word	Warning
Hazard statements	H351
Precautionary statements	P203, P280, P318, P405, P501
- Except where otherwise noted, data are given for materials in their standard state (at 25 °C [77 °F], 100 kPa). Infobox references

Fumonisin B_{1} is the most prevalent member of a family of toxins, known as fumonisins, produced by multiple species of Fusarium molds, such as Fusarium verticillioides, which occur mainly in maize (corn), wheat and other cereals. Fumonisin B1 contamination of maize has been reported worldwide at mg/kg levels. Human exposure occurs at levels of micrograms to milligrams per day and is greatest in regions where maize products are the dietary staple.

Fumonisin B_{1} is hepatotoxic and nephrotoxic in all animal species tested. The earliest histological change to appear in either the liver or kidney of fumonisin-treated animals is increased apoptosis followed by regenerative cell proliferation. While the acute toxicity of fumonisin is low, it is the known cause of two diseases which occur in domestic animals with rapid onset: equine leukoencephalomalacia and porcine pulmonary oedema syndrome. Both of these diseases involve disturbed sphingolipid metabolism and cardiovascular dysfunction.

== History ==
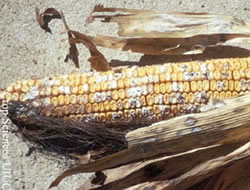
Figure 1: Fusarium ear rot, caused by the fungi Fusarium verticillioides and F. proliferatum, may typically be a more common ear rot of corn. Source: UIUC available at: http://www.extension.umn.edu/cropenews/2007/07MNCN42.html

In 1970, an outbreak of leukoencephalomalacia in horses in South Africa was associated with the contamination of corn with the fungus Fusarium verticillioides. It is one of the most prevalent seed-borne fungi associated with corn. Another study was done on the possible role of fungal toxins in the etiology of human esophageal cancer in a region in South Africa. The diet of the people living in this area was homegrown corn and F. verticillioides was the most prevalent fungus in the corn consumed by the people with high incidence of esophageal cancer. Further outbreaks of leukoencephalomalacia and people in certain regions with high incidence of esophageal cancer led to more research on F. verticillioides. Soon they found experimentally that F. verticillioides caused leukoencephalomalacia in horses and porcine pulmonary edema in pigs. It was found to be highly hepatotoxic and cardiotoxic in rats. In 1984 it was shown that the fungus was hepatocarcinogenic in rats. The chemical nature of the metabolites causing all this had still not been discovered in 1984. After discovery of the carcinogenicity of the fungus, isolation and chemical characterization of the mycotoxins and carcinogens produced by F. verticillioides was urgent. It was not until 1988 that the chemical nature of the carcinogen was unraveled. Fumonisin B_{1} and fumonisin B_{2} were isolated from cultures of F. verticillioides at the Programme on Mycotoxins and Experimental Carcinogenesis. The structures were elucidated in collaboration with the Council for Scientific and Industrial Research. Several isomers of fumonisin B1 have been detected in solid rice culture. Now more than 100 different fumonisins are known, the most important ones being fumonisin B_{1}, B_{2} and B_{3}.

== Toxicokinetics ==
Regarding toxicokinetics there is no human data available, but research on animals has been done.

=== Absorption ===
FB_{1} is taken orally via food. Overall, FB_{1} is poorly absorbed, less than 6%. Absorption of orally administered fumonisin B_{1} (10 mg/kg body weight) to rats is low (3.5% of dose) but rapid (T_{max} = 1.02 h). FB_{1} does not significantly permeate through the human skin and hence has no significant systemic health risk after dermal exposure.

=== Distribution ===
After absorption, some appears to be retained in liver and kidneys. For rats that were fed diets containing fumonisins for several weeks, the concentrations of the fumonisins in the kidneys were approximately 10-fold higher than in the liver.

Plasma distribution of the absorbed dose conformed to a two-compartment open model and the tissue (liver, kidney) concentration time results were consistent with a one-compartment open model.

=== Excretion ===
Elimination half-life in rats is 3.15 h for plasma, 4.07 h for liver, and 7.07 h for kidney. However, FB_{1} is rapidly excreted mostly in its original form. Small amounts are excreted in urine; the most are excreted in feces.

== Toxicodynamics ==
Because of their similarity, fumonisins are able to inhibit sphingosine-sphinganin-transferases and ceramide synthases and are therefore competitive inhibitors of sphingolipid biosynthesis and metabolism.

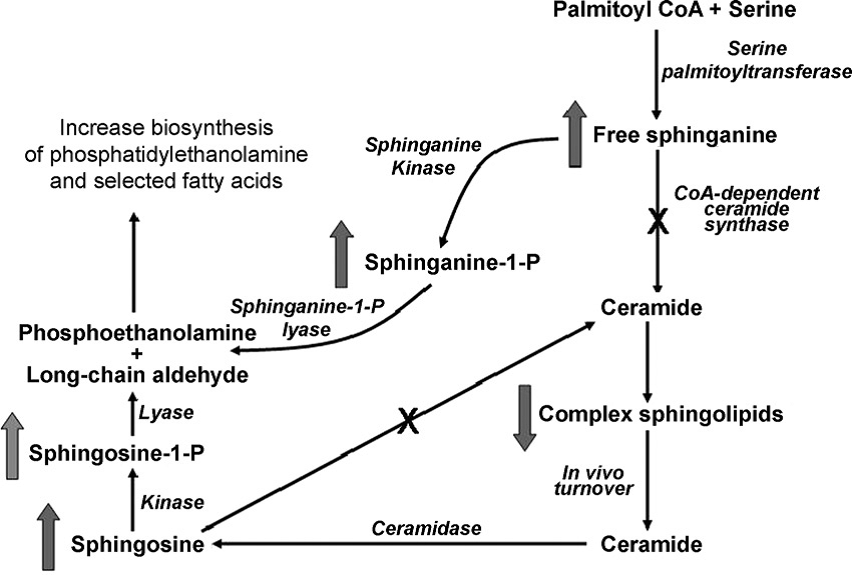
Figure 2: Sphingolipid metabolism showing the inhibition of ceramide synthase (x) by fumonisins and the changed concentrations of other compounds caused by this inhibition.

Figure 2 shows the sphingolipid metabolism (schematic) and the inhibition caused by fumonisins. Fumonisin B_{1} inhibits the enzyme ceramide synthase (sphingosine N-acyltransferase), which acylates sphingoid bases. This blocks the formation of ceramide via two pathways. It inhibits de formation via de novo sphinganine and fatty acyl-CoA and via sphingosine produced by the breakdown of ceramide by ceramidase. The inhibition results in increased concentrations of sphinganine, sphingosine and their 1-phosphate metabolites and in decreased concentrations of complex sphingolipids. The accumulation of sphinganine and sphingosine is a primary cause of the toxicity of fumonisin B_{1} Sphinganine and sphingosine are cytotoxic, and have growth inhibitory effects. Also, these sphingoid bases induce apoptosis. Increased apoptosis seems to play an important role in the toxic effects including tumor induction. However, it should be mentioned that the reduced concentration of ceramide and the increased concentration of sphingosine-1-phosphate (as a result of FB_{1} intake) cause an inhibition of apoptosis and promote mitosis and regeneration. The balance between the intracellular concentration of compounds that inhibit apoptosis and those that induce apoptosis will determine the cellular response. Also, the decreased concentrations of complex sphingolipids appear to play a role in the abnormal behavior and altered morphology of the affected cells.

== Mechanism of action ==
In biochemical experiments, when the tricarbillic acid groups are removed from FB_{1} by hydrolysis, the resulting product (aminopentol, AP1) does not only act as an inhibitor, but also as a substrate for ceramide synthase; aminopentol is acylated by ceramide synthase to form N-palmitoyl-AP1. This supports the suggestion that the aminopentol part of FB_{1} occupies the space of sphinganine in the enzyme. N-palmitoyl-AP1 is an even more potent inhibitor of ceramide synthase and may therefore play a role in the toxicity of nixtamalized fumonisins. This suggested part of FB_{1} with structural similarity with sphingoid bases (the aminopentol part) may interact with the sphinganine binding site, whereas the negatively charged tricarbyllic acid groups may interact with the fatty acyl-CoA binding site.

Structural and biochemical studies of human Ceramide Synthase 6 showed that the enzyme sequentially reacts first with acyl-CoA and then sphinganine in a ping-pong reaction. FB_{1} substitutes for sphinganine in the second step of this reaction and is acylated by the enzyme, with the protein trapped in the product (acyl-FB_{1}) bound state.

== Toxic effects ==
The risks of fumonisin B1 have been evaluated by The World Health Organization's International Programme on Chemical Safety and the Scientific Committee on Food of the European Commission. They determined a tolerable daily intake for FB_{1}, FB_{2}, FB_{3}, alone or in combination of 2 μg/kg body weight. Until now, nothing about the kinetics and metabolism of fumonisin B_{1} in humans have been reported. On other animals much research has been done, but it might not be comparable to humans. In mice the elimination of FB_{1} is very rapid, but in humans it could be much slower considering their body weight. There are several possible pathways that cause toxic effects of fumonisin B_{1}. Most toxic effects are due to altered sphingolipid metabolism by inhibition of ceramide synthase. Production of reactive oxygen species could occur. This increases oxidative stress and induce lipid peroxidation and could damage cells. In agreement with this some studies showed decreased levels of glutathione in liver, but other studies showed even elevated levels of glutathione. Cytotoxic effects have also been reported. Another effect of exposure to FB_{1} is apoptosis. This has been observed in a number of different cells and tissues. Inhibition of ceramide synthase is not responsible for this effect. The main factors could be DNA fragmentation and caspase-3 activation. FB_{1} has also immunotoxic effects, but much more research is necessary to get a clear overview of the effects on the immune system.

=== Toxic effects in humans ===
==== Neural tube defects ====
Neural tube defect are abnormalities of the brain and spinal cord in the embryo resulting from failure of the neural tube to close. Epidemiological studies and clinical trials have pointed out folate deficiency as a major risk factor for neural tube defects. FB_{1} disrupts sphingolipid metabolism and therefore this could affect folate uptake and cause neural tube defects. In 1990 and 1991 a sudden outbreak of neural tube defects occurred along the Texas–Mexico border. It is believed that this outbreak might have been due to high levels of FB_{1} that were observed in corn during previous years. Regions in China and South Africa with high corn consumption also have a high prevalence of neural tube defects.

==== Esophageal cancer ====
It is thought that there is a relationship between the occurrence of F. verticillioides and human esophageal cancer. A low socioeconomic status and a less varied diet, that mainly consists of corn and wheat, is associated with the appearance of esophageal cancer. This derives from epidemiologic studies in various countries. Other studies show that higher concentrations of FB_{1}, FB_{2} and F. verticillioides are present in corn growing in regions with a high percentage of esophageal cancer. This in contrast with regions with low levels of F. verticillioides, FB_{1} and FB_{2} in corn. On top of this it seems that people with a high corn intake are at higher risk to develop esophageal cancer than people with low corn intake. This is observed by people in regions in Italy, Iran, Kenia, Zimbabwe, United States and Brazil with high incidence of esophageal cancer. Another study on the relationship between sphingolipid levels and cancer incidence did not show any significant relationship between serum sphingolipids and risk of esophageal cancer. This is quite remarkable, because elevated levels of sphingolipids sphinganine and sphingosine are believed to be biomarkers for exposure of FB_{1}.

==== Acute mycotoxicosis ====
Acute mycotoxicosis is food poisoning by food products contaminated by fungi. In 1995 an outbreak of disease characterized by diarrhea and abdominal pain occurred in 27 villages in India. This was the result of consumption of moldy sorghum and corn due to rain damage. This outbreak was studied and the mycotoxicosis was connected to consumption of unleavened bread. Corn and sorghum samples were collected from the households and examined. The corn and sorghum were contaminated by Fusarium and Aspergillus and contained high levels of FB_{1} compared with samples of unaffected households.

=== Toxic effects in animals ===
Much research has been done on toxic effects of FB_{1} in animals. In vivo studies indicate that liver and kidneys are the main target organs. Fumonisins are poorly absorbed, rapidly eliminated and not metabolized in animals. In pigs and rats there is a wide distribution of FB_{1} and small amounts have been found to accumulate only in liver and kidneys. In vervet monkeys, some FB_{1} is partially hydrolyzed in the gut.

==== Carcinogenic effects ====
In rats and mice that were exposed to FB_{1} tumor formation occurred. Several studies on this subject have been done. Depending on the strain of mice being used different carcinomas were shown. FB_{1} is shown to be nongenotoxic. Therefore, the mechanisms responsible for cancer development should lie elsewhere. Important mechanisms for cancer development due to fumonisin B_{1} could be oxidative damage (production of reactive oxygen species) and lipid peroxidation. Hepatic and renal tumors could also be due to apoptosis by FB_{1}. As a response to this there could be continuous regeneration of cells, causing cancer. It seems to be that disrupted sphingolipid metabolism is the causative factor for FB_{1}-induced carcinogenicity, as is the case with the toxic effects. Based on all these animal studies FB_{1} is classified by The International Agency for Research on Cancer (IARC) as possibly carcinogenic to humans (Group 2B).

==== Porcine pulmonary edema ====
Porcine pulmonary edema due to FB_{1} is intensively studied after the first report in 1981 of swine with pulmonary edema after exposure to corn contaminated with F. verticillioides. Alteration in sphingolipid biosynthesis are reported, especially in lung, heart, kidney and liver tissue. Lethal pulmonary edema was developed within 4–7 days after exposure to feed with concentrations of FB_{1} >16 mg/kg body weight (>92 parts per million). Doses of 10 parts per million caused a milder form of pulmonary edema.

==== Equine leukoencephalomalacia ====
Leukoencephalomalacia is a neurotoxic disease of horses. Outbreaks of this disease in the 20th century resulted in a number of studies. Apparently FB_{1} was the cause for this disease. There were shown elevated levels of serum enzyme levels that indicate liver damage. They were normally observed by an elevation of the sphinganine/sphingosine ratio. FB_{1} possibly induces cardiovascular function, because of the elevated sphinganine/sphingosine ratio. This could be one of the main factors that causes leukoencephalomalacia.

=== Toxicity in laboratory animals ===
Effects of feeding rats with FB_{1} for up to 90 days were usually nephrotoxicity. Between different strains of rats, sensitivity to FB_{1} varied. In the kidneys the main effect was apoptosis. Also tubular atrophy and regeneration as well as decreased kidney weight was reported. Histopathologic effects on rat liver were reported after both short- and long-term exposure. The main cause was apoptosis. Mice do not seem to be very sensitive to nephrotoxic effects in comparison with rats. In mouse kidneys little histological changes were seen by high dose exposure. The liver was also the main target organ in mice. Pathology is similar as in rats, with apoptosis and hepatocellular hyperplasia. Fumonisin B_{1} is possibly embryotoxic if the dose is maternally toxic. A number of studies on genotoxicity indicated no mutagenetic effects. Although fumonisin could damage DNA directly by production of reactive oxygen species. Mouse embryos were exposed to FB_{1} and they showed inhibited sphingolipid synthesis and growth. It caused neural tube defects. Folic acid uptake was dramatically inhibited. Treatment after exposure with folic acid reduced neural tube defects by 50–65%.

== Tolerable daily intake ==
The risks of fumonisin B1 have been evaluated by The World Health Organization's International Programme on Chemical Safety and the Scientific Committee on Food of the European Commission. They determined a tolerable daily intake for FB_{1}, FB_{2}, FB_{3}, alone or in combination of 2 μg/kg body weight.

== Detoxification ==
The inhibition of ceramide synthase by FB_{1} is thought to be reversible, since the binding is formed by noncovalent interactions. Factors that will probably induce this reversibility are reduction of cellular FB_{1}-concentration and increasing of cellular concentrations of the substrates for ceramide synthase. Also, the rate of removal of the accumulated sphinganine and sphingosine will affect the detoxification.

Structure of aminopentol

Metabolism of FB_{1} most likely occurs in the gut since partially hydrolysed and fully hydrolysed FB_{1} were recovered in faeces but not in bile of vervet monkeys. Bioavailability of FB_{1} can be reduced by treating fumonisin-contaminated corn with glucomannans extracted from the cell wall of the yeast Saccharomyces cerevisiae. These polysaccharides are able to bind certain mycotoxins and have a 67% binding capacity for fumonisins.

The enzyme fumonisin B1 esterase characterised from a bacterium of Sphingopyxis species hydrolyses FB_{1}, to aminopentol by removing two ester groups. This has been suggested as a method for decontamination.
