= Ceramide synthase 6 =

Enzyme found in humans

CERS6

Identifiers
- Aliases: CERS6, CERS5, LASS6, ceramide synthase 6
- External IDs: OMIM: 615336; MGI: 2442564; GeneCards: CERS6
Available structures
PDB	Ortholog search: PDBe RCSB
PDB	List of PDB id codes 1X2M
Enzyme activity
EC #	BRENDA	ExPASy	KEGG	MetaCyc
2.3.1.24	↗	↗	↗	↗
2.3.1.291	↗	↗	↗	↗

Gene location (Human)
Chr.	Chromosome 2 (human)
Band	2q24.3	Start	168,456,249 bp
Band	2q24.3	End	168,775,134 bp

Gene location (Mouse)
Chr.	Chromosome 2 (mouse)
Band	2|2 C2	Start	68,691,785 bp
Band	2|2 C2	End	68,944,626 bp
RNA expression pattern
Bgee	Human / Mouse (ortholog); Top expressed in: hair follicle; corpus epididymis; mucosa of sigmoid colon; decidua; jejunal mucosa; ganglionic eminence; orbitofrontal cortex; middle temporal gyrus; epithelium of bronchus; bronchial epithelial cell / Top expressed in: zygote; gastrula; secondary oocyte; epithelium of small intestine; granulocyte; decidua; Gonadal ridge; transitional epithelium of urinary bladder; primary oocyte; ileum; More reference expression data
BioGPS	n/a
Gene ontology
Molecular function	DNA binding; sphingosine N-acyltransferase activity; DNA-binding transcription factor activity, RNA polymerase II-specific; protein binding
Cellular component	integral component of membrane; nuclear membrane; endoplasmic reticulum membrane; membrane; nucleus; endoplasmic reticulum
Biological process	lipid metabolism; sphingolipid biosynthetic process; ceramide biosynthetic process; regulation of transcription by RNA polymerase II
Sources:Amigo / QuickGO
Orthologs
Databases	NCBI: entry; OMA: entry
Species	Human	Mouse
Entrez	253782	241447
Ensembl	ENSG00000172292	ENSMUSG00000027035
UniProt	Q6ZMG9	Q8C172
RefSeq (mRNA)	NM_001256126; NM_203463	NM_172856; NM_001347161
RefSeq (protein)	NP_001243055; NP_982288	NP_001334090; NP_766444
Location (UCSC)	Chr 2: 168.46 – 168.78 Mb	Chr 2: 68.69 – 68.94 Mb
PubMed search
- Wikidata
View/Edit Human	View/Edit Mouse

Ceramide synthase 6 is an enzyme that in humans is encoded by the CERS6 gene.
