= N-terminal nucleophile hydrolases =

Protein structural motif

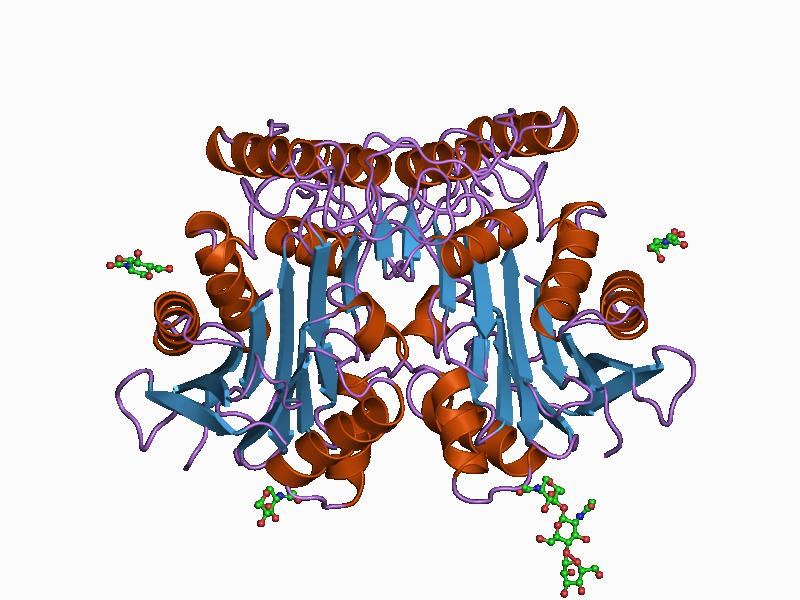
- HUMAN ASPARTYLGLUCOSAMINIDASE

Identifiers
- Symbol: Ntn-hydrolases
- Pfam clan: CL0052
- ECOD: 210.1

In molecular biology, the N-terminal nucleophile (Ntn)-hydrolases are a structural superfamily of evolutionarily related enzymes that have diverged beyond any recognisable sequence similarity.

== Structure ==
Ntn-hydrolases share a characteristic "αββα-fold" - a four-layered structure with two antiparallel β-sheets sandwiched between α-helical layers. However, the packing angles between the β-sheets vary significantly (5-35°) across different enzymes.

Despite minimal sequence similarity, the researchers identified eight completely conserved secondary structural elements (termed "region C") that are essential for the fold. Five of these elements (β4, β5, β11, β12 strands and α11 helix) contain most of the functionally important residues.

== Catalytic mechanism ==
All enzymes use a similar catalytic strategy with:

- An N-terminal nucleophile (threonine, serine, or cysteine) that acts as both nucleophile and catalytic base

- Formation of a covalent intermediate during substrate hydrolysis

- An oxyanion hole that stabilises the reaction intermediate

While the core catalytic machinery is conserved, the substrate binding sites and some aspects of the oxyanion hole differ between enzymes, reflecting their different substrate specificities.

== Examples of proteins belonging to this superfamily ==
=== Human Subfamilies ===
Sources:

1. Class II Glutamine Amidotransferases (GAT)

These enzymes use cysteine nucleophiles and release ammonia from glutamine for biosynthetic reactions. Deficiencies cause severe diseases (e.g., asparagine synthetase deficiency, congenital myasthenic syndrome). Some examples are ASNS, GPAT and GFAT1/2.

2. PVA Subfamily (Lysosomal Hydrolases)

These proteins use cysteine nucleophiles and hydrolyse fatty acid-amide bonds in sphingolipids. Deficiencies lead to lysosomal storage diseases like Farber disease. Examples are acid ceramidase (ASAH1), NAAA, PLBD1/2, and secernins,

3. Proteasome Subunits

They use threonine nucleophiles and form the catalytic core of the 20S proteasome. Three active β-subunits (β1, β2, β5) degrade ubiquitinated proteins. Immunoproteasome variants (β1i, β2i, β5i) are induced by interferon-γ,

4. Asparaginases (AGA Family)

Use threonine nucleophiles. This group includes lysosomal aspartylglucosaminidase (AGA), ASRGL1, and TASP1. AGA deficiency causes aspartylglucosaminuria, a lysosomal storage disorder, while ASRGL1 has potential as cancer therapeutic.

5. γ-Glutamyl Transpeptidases (GGT)

The six or seven members (GGT1-7) of this group use threonine nucleophiles and transfer or hydrolyse γ-glutamyl groups from glutathione and other substrates. GGT1 is a diagnostic marker for liver disease; its deficiency causes glutathionuria.

=== Bacterial members ===
Bacteria possess multiple Ntn-hydrolases including penicillin G/V acylases (e.g., from E. coli, Bacillus sphaericus, and Streptomyces mobaraensis), γ-glutamyl transpeptidases, isoaspartyl dipeptidases, and specialised enzymes such as N-acyl homoserine lactone acylases (e.g., PvdQ from Pseudomonas aeruginosa). Some Ntn-hydrolases such as bile salt hydrolases are widespread in probiotic lactic acid bacteria and play roles in bile detoxification and gut colonisation. In addition, unusual variants like β-aminopeptidases (e.g., BapA, DmpA-like family) and peptide amidases are also found in bacteria, often with unique substrate specificities.

=== Examples in yeast ===
Yeast possesses several major Ntn-hydrolases, which play crucial roles in protein degradation and metabolic processes. The most prominent examples include subunits of the 20S proteasome and gamma-glutamyl transpeptidase. As an example, the 20S proteasome in Saccharomyces cerevisiae has multiple β-type subunits (such as PRE2, PRE3, PRE4) that are classical Ntn-hydrolases activated by autocatalytic cleavage to reveal the N-terminal threonine nucleophile. Gamma-Glutamyl Transpeptidase (ECM38) regulates glutathione metabolism, cellular redox status, and detoxification processes.

== Clinical relevance ==
Many Ntn-hydrolases are clinically important as disease-associated proteins, diagnostic markers, or therapeutic targets.
