= Developmental symbiosis =

Developmental symbiosis is a biological phenomenon in which the normal development of an organism depends on interactions with symbiotic partners, often microbes, that influence gene expression, tissue formation, or physiological function.

Symbiosis is the intimate relationship between one or more organisms of different species. These organisms are referred to as symbionts. Many types of relationships are found in symbiosis; three examples are mutualism, commensalism, and parasitism. As the name suggests, mutualism is a mutual dynamic between the organisms where both can benefit from the relationship. Parasitism, however, is when one organism actively harms the host for their own benefit. Commensalism refers to a relationship where only one organism benefits while the other gains nothing but is also left unharmed. The most common type is the mutualistic relationship and can be viewed as either obligatory or facultative. Developmental symbiosis is the relationship between a developing organism and specific microorganisms.

Microscopic organisms exist all around the globe, even in the human body. They are responsible for the formation of many developmental functions within the body from its earliest stages of life. Microorganisms are prevalent in most somatic tissues and in reproductive germline cells. Certain bacteria allow cells to determine whether other bacteria are either harmful or helpful, building a stronger and sharper immune system. Other bacteria aid in the development of tissue to fully form structures of an organism's body.

Understanding the strong relation between developmental symbiosis and evolution is crucial to understanding how organisms function and adapt over time. This connection emphasizes that many different plants and animals are heavily influenced by the internal and external symbiotic microbes to develop their bodily structures and functions.

== History ==
Scientific understanding of symbiosis in development arose in the 19th century, particularly through the study of lichens and legumes.

=== Lichens ===
Lichens had long been considered a discrete plant organism. In 1866, one researcher, Heinrich Anton de Bary, speculated that gelatinous lichens might actually form as a result of the penetration of an alga by a fungus. The following year, Simon Schwendener advanced the view that all lichens could be considered the product of such an association, notably in which the fungus exploits the algae. Schwendener received harsh opposition, as the dual nature of lichen challenged the traditional taxonomic view.

In 1873, Albert Frank conducted studies on hypophloedal lichens, which grow beneath the outermost layer of bark. He proposed that the association between fungi and algae is far more complex than simple parasitism, introducing the term "symbiotismus" to describe this intimate relationship. Two years later, Bary expanded on this concept by formally defining the dual nature of lichens as "Symbiose" in a lecture to German naturalists and physicians at Cassel. Later, in his publication Die Erscheinung der Symbiose, Bary refined the definition of symbiosis, establishing three fundamental criteria: (1) two entities must live together, (2) they must be in physical contact, and (3) they must be of different species.

=== Legumes ===
While the study of lichens dominated early symbiosis research, parallel discoveries in microbiology soon expanded the concept of symbiosis. Toward the end of the 19th century, Hermann Hellriegel demonstrated that legumes form nodules in response to microbial colonization. Using sterilized sand cultures, he showed that bacteria in the soil are responsible for inducing nodule formation, enabling leguminous plants to fix atmospheric nitrogen and grow even in nitrogen-poor soils. Dutch microbiologist Martinus Beijerinck later successfully isolated the bacteria from legume root nodules and named it Rhizobium.

== Types ==
=== Obligate symbiosis ===
Obligate symbiosis is a type of symbiotic relationship in which at least one organism, the symbiont, cannot survive independently and requires a host organism to survive and/or reproduce. The symbiont organism can survive by living on or inside of the host organism. A big form of this is endosymbiosis, where one organism lives inside the cells of another in a close, often essential, relationship.

This type of symbiosis can be harmful or beneficial to the host organism. Some obligate symbionts can cause deleterious mutations to the host organism, causing altered gene expression or manipulation of the host's reproductive systems to help reproduce more of the symbiont species. This benefits the symbiont, but in turn, can harm the fitness of the host. To benefit the host, some symbiont organisms provide essential nutrients and/or vitamins that the host would not normally be able to synthesize or consume. Symbionts can also provide priming for the host's immune system, allowing the immune system to fight off future infections more effectively.

Obligate relationships are often referred to as a process known as a "rabbit hole." The "rabbit hole" process is a metaphor for when the obligate organisms become committed to an inherited, mutually dependent symbiotic relationship in which both organisms are affected by unusual genomic evolutions. Changes for the symbionts can involve genome reduction, rapid protein evolution, and codon reassignments. In contrast, the host's changes can involve acquiring bacterial genes to help regulate and support their symbionts. These evolutionary changes are often irreversible and highly complex, leading to continuous and profound transformations in both partners—hence the term "rabbit hole." Once the process becomes permanently established this relationship cannot be broken without causing harm or death to one or both partners.

=== Facultative symbiosis ===
Facultative symbiosis is a type of symbiotic relationship where organisms do not require one another for survival or reproduction. This means they can live independently, and still participate in symbiotic interactions. Organisms that choose to have facultative symbiosis do so due to the benefits. These benefits can be mutual, commensal or parasitic. Facultative symbiotic relationships and host changes can happen when organisms gain new genes from other species or lose important genes due to mutations, making them more dependent on their partners.

Facultative symbionts can provide protection against environmental stressors and some provide nutritional benefits. An example of this is the relationship between clownfish and sea anemone. The sea anemone provides protection for clownfish through its stinging tentacles, and the anemone benefits from cleaning by water circulation, being provided nitrogen compounds, and luring prey by the bright colors of the clownfish. Some bacteria (Serratia symbiotica) help aphids resist fungal infections and survive extreme temperatures. These relationships are becoming harder to detect or study, meaning that this could lead to biases in research.

In some species, facultative bacteria can be passed down to offspring (vertical transmission), allowing the relationship to continue across generations. As the offspring grows, the facultative relationship between host and symbionts can strengthen. This leads to a deeper physiological integration, where the host relies on the symbionts for nutrient synthesis, defense, and/or environmental adaptation. Meaning over time, the relationship may shift from facultative to obligate symbiosis.When facultative symbiosis becomes essential for survival, the relationship evolves into an obligate relationship. This transition is not always a one-way process. This means that even after becoming obligate, the symbiosis can revert or break down under the right conditions This shift from facultative to obligate is often seen in tightly integrated systems, such as those involving host-microbe interactions or plant-pollinator relationships, especially when consistent mutual benefit leads to genetic or physiological adaptations that make independent survival less practical.

=== Vertical vs. horizontal transmission ===
As most animals use either vertical or horizontal transmission, there are some animals that use both. As an example, holometabolous insects use both vertical and horizontal transmission of gut bacteria.

==== Vertical transmission ====
Vertical transmission refers to the transferring of symbionts directly from parent to offspring. This process ensures that each generation of hosts inherit a symbiotic partner. This maintains the symbiotic relation over time. Since the symbionts are consistently passed from parent to offspring, the host and symbiont co-evolve, making it unnecessary for the host to obtain the symbiont from nature each generation. Vertical transmission can be found in all types but is mostly found in obligate symbiosis, where the host is dependent on the symbiont and vice versa. As symbionts live in a protected environment (in the host), they lose the ability to survive on their own.

In aphids, for example, the subpopulation of a single mother's bacteriocyte is transferred to the embryo. Later on, in cellularization, the symbionts that have penetrated the embryo are subdivided again into different bacteriocytes, restarting and reaffirming the symbiotic relationship.

==== Horizontal transmission ====
Horizontal transmission involves the gaining of symbionts from the external environment or other individuals, rather than from a parent. This transmission process can happen at all stages of life in different ways such as eating, physical contact, environmental exposure, or interactions with other individuals. This approach allows for greater flexibility and adaptability, enabling animals like insects to pick up microbes suited to new diets, habitats, or environmental conditions. Horizontal transmission allows animals to obtain symbionts that are well-suited to handle the current environment or changes in diet, instead of being bound to the symbiont, like in vertical transmission. Because the symbionts gained come from a variety of places, horizontal transmitted host tend to be diverse and allow them to adapt to new environments. It is important that hosts must encounter the right symbionts at the right time, because if the necessary symbionts are not present in the environment, the host may suffer.

== Molecular and Genetic Mechanisms ==
Symbiotic organisms produce signals within their hosts to influence certain functions within the host's body. These functions can range from gene expression to immune response to foreign bacteria.

=== Lipid-derived molecules ===
Sphingolipids are vital in maintaining gut health and promoting symbiosis with the host. These lipids are produced by gut bacteria like the Bacteroides species and are often located in the bacterial outer membrane of cells. They contribute to influencing iNKT cell regulation and fighting off risks of Inflammatory Bowel Disease (IBD) through the use of lipid signaling within the host's immune system. They can also be located within endosomes and the Golgi apparatus. Within the gut, they will send signals to inflammation-related pathways to influence the lipid metabolism of the host. There, they will regulate immune cells to low the chances of inflammation. The absence of Bacteroides-derived sphingolipids can lead to gut inflammation and alterations to the host's ceramide levels, which will negatively impact the host's ability to maintain homeostasis. Bacteroides sphingolipids can interact with the host's immune system through its outer membrane vesicles. The sphingolipids within these vesicles will activate the Toll-like receptor 2 signaling in macrophages, limiting inflammatory signaling. Bacteroides sphingolipids can move to other parts within the host's body to aid in immune system maintenance.

=== Polysaccharides ===
Polysaccharide A (PSA) is a capsular carbohydrate from the commensal gut bacteria Bacteroides fragilis and possess both potent T cell-dependent pro- and anti-inflammatory properties. This molecule, produced by Bacteroides fragilis, is a model symbiotic immunomodulatory molecule. It interacts with Toll-like receptor 1 and 2 as well as Dectin-1 to activate the phosphoinositide 3-kinase pathway in order to express the anti-inflammatory genes. Dectin-1 binds to the fungal polysaccharide, β-glucans, which then triggers a signaling cascade events that leads to the recruitment of signaling molecules, such as tyrosine-protein kinase and CARD9, which further activate downstream pathways to enhance immune cells to target and destroy fungal pathogens.

== Plants ==
Plants in both natural and agricultural environments are consistently exposed to diverse microbial communities, which can include both symbiotic and harmful species. Symbiotic associations can influence plant development by modulating root architecture, altering hormone signaling pathways, and enhancing responses to environmental stress. In certain plant species, such as orchids, successful seed germination and early development depend on the presence of fungal partners. Ongoing research continues to investigate the molecular and cellular mechanisms that mediate these interactions.

For several examples of developmental symbiosis in plants, see applications.

== Human health ==
In humans, the gut microbiota acts as a developmental symbiotic relationship in which microbes have a food source and humans can properly digest nutrition. The gut microbiota refers to all of the microorganisms living primarily in the intestinal tract of the human body. The human body has different microbiota composition throughout life, resulting in different compositions at different points of life. Two stages are from birth to weaning and from weaning to adulthood. The diversity of the microbiota is important for the proper health of the host. Early exposure to these bacteria and a proper diet throughout one's life are important for a healthy intestinal tract. Humans begin this symbiotic relationship during gestation, where they are exposed to some bacteria, but most bacteria are acquired from the mother during birth or from receiving the mother's milk.

=== Role in Immune System Development ===
The development of a healthy microbiota is also important for an individual to remain healthy and ensure the immune system can function normally. This development of both proper digestion and the importance of the immune system introduces the idea of symbiopoiesis. Symbiopoiesis is a co-development that is vital for the host to have proper development, like its organs. When compared to host organisms with proper gut microbiota, those without bacteria had decreased cell proliferation, decreased immune system development, and decreased gene expression. The lack of bacteria in the gut leads to a decrease in macrophages in the intestinal tract, which digest harmful pathogens and prevent infection. Hosts without bacteria in their gut also had decreased levels of cytokines and immunoglobulins, impairing the proper function of the immune system to react properly to infections within the body. An example of this in humans is babies born naturally versus those born in a C-section. Those born naturally have developed a proper immunity, whereas those born via a C-section did not get the same exposure to bacteria.

=== Influence on Neurological development ===
The microbes within the gut were shown to have a great effect on the brain as the microbes help to produce important neurotransmitters such as dopamine, serotonin, and γ-aminobutyric acid (GABA). The lack of these neurotransmitters and their receptors would cause the organism to have a lack of proper neurodevelopment.

== Developmental Symbiosis in other animals ==
Most of the problems seen in humans when it comes to the development of or lack of a symbiotic relationship with bacteria are similar to those in other animals. Any other mammal that gives vaginal birth will experience the same process as humans. The relationship between animals and bacteria is a result of co-evolution over millions of years. This is concluded due to the dependency that animals and bacteria have developed for each other and how important it is for one to have the other. Different animals have developed through co-evolution unique microbiomes based on their diet so that the bacteria in their gut are best for the food sources they use. Different animals also use microbes for more than just digestion, but protection, like Wolbachia bacteria, which can be used to protect unhatched offspring. However, the means by which animals like birds obtain their gut microbiome differ from that of mammals. Birds typically obtain most of their gut microbiota from the regurgitative feeding received from the parents after hatching occurs as well as early environmental exposure.

== Evolutionary Integration through symbiosis ==
Long term co-evolution is an evolutionary process where two or more species interact closely over periods of time, where each species influences each other. The co-evolution between the host and symbiont results in genetic, biochemical, and structural changes in both parties. As the endosymbiotic relationship evolves, the genomes of the host and the symbiont become more interconnected, often through horizontal gene transfer (HGT), where genetic material from the symbiont is incorporated into the host's genome. Over time, this makes the host partly responsible for keeping the symbiont's functions going. Because the symbiont's loss of autonomy, it also loses its innate ability to survive outside the host environment, as they both evolve. Host and symbiont alike go through genome reduction as they become dependent on each other.

Co-evolution, through a process known as symbiogenesis, can lead to specific changes in metabolic functions. In humans, mitochondria evolved to become the main energy center of the eukaryotic cell, specializing in aerobic respiration and ATP production. Plastids in plants and algae evolve to specialize in photosynthesis. Symbionts such as these also evolve not only for the symbiotic relationship but also for themselves. Mitochondria have their own membranes that are distinct from the host cell's membranes, a remnant of their prokaryotic origin.

Long-term co-evolution enables species to adapt to their environment in ways that would not be possible through independent evolution alone. Symbiosis provides a pathway for new functions and complex relationships to evolve.

== Experimental Techniques ==
Developmental symbiosis remains a rapidly evolving field with much still to be discovered regarding the intricate relationships between hosts and their symbionts. To investigate these interactions, researchers can currently employ a diverse array of experimental techniques, ranging from molecular sequencing, to imaging technologies, and to germ-free models.

=== Microbiome Sequencing ===
Symbiosis research heavily focuses on microbiomes. In humans, microbial cells outnumber human cells by approximately 10 to 1, underscoring their significance. Next-Generation Sequencing (NGS) technologies can analyze microbiome composition and function.

Sample preparation involves collection from environments like the gut or skin, followed by flash-freezing or storage in microbiome media to preserve microbial integrity. Extracted DNA is then fragmented and prepared for sequencing. Two primary approaches exist: amplicon sequencing, which targets genetic markers like 16S rRNA (bacteria) and 18S rRNA (eukaryotic microbes), and whole genome shotgun sequencing, which sequences entire microbial genomes. During sequencing, DNA is denatured into single strands, and complementary strands are synthesized. Fluorescent signals emitted during synthesis are captured and converted into nucleotide sequences. NGS can generate vast datasets with high efficiency, enabling researchers to investigate symbiotic interactions, identify microbial imbalances, and assess microbiome influences on host development and health.

Although microbiome sequencing technologies are a powerful tool, they do have several limitations. Sample collection and DNA extraction can introduce inaccurate representations, as microbial communities can shift during collection. Contamination, high costs, and computational demands can also pose challenges.

=== Imaging Techniques ===
Advanced imaging techniques can complement sequencing approaches, allowing researchers to visualize symbiotic interactions at cellular and molecular levels. Fluorescence in situ hybridization (FISH) can identify spatial localization of microbial species through hybridization with a nucleic acid target in host tissues. Confocal and electron microscopy can provide high-resolution imaging of host-microbe interactions. Live-cell imaging also facilitates real-time observation of dynamic interactions between symbionts and host cells, unveiling molecular processes. These methods are central to mapping the structural organization of symbiotic associations and discerning their functional implications.

=== Germ-Free Model Organisms ===
Germ-free (GF) model organisms are bred and maintained in sterile isolators, eradicating exposure to microorganisms. Researchers use GF models to investigate the impact of a complete lack of microbiota on host development. Moreover, GF models can be utilized to create gnotobiotic models, where specific microbes are introduced under controlled conditions. Such models can be invaluable for studying the influence of symbiotic microorganisms.

The production and maintenance of isolated GF animals need particular facilities. The cost, labor, and skills necessary to preserve them can make these models inaccessible to many researchers.

== Applications and Future Research ==
=== Synthetic Microbial Research Communities ===
Synthetic biology focuses on engineering beneficial symbioses by leveraging engineering principles to create new symbiotic relationships or manipulate pre-existing ones. This includes engineering microbes for specific functions, like nitrogen fixation in plants, or modulating host-microbiome interactions for improved health. Synthetic biology allows for the creation of new or enhanced symbiotic relationships, contributing to sustainable agriculture and human health. Work to create artificial microbial communities is necessary to recreate and observe interactions between the symbionts to strengthen our understanding of the complexity of nature and agriculture.

=== Symbiotic Nitrogen Fixation ===
Symbiotic nitrogen fixation is a mutually beneficial relationship where nitrogen-fixing bacteria convert atmospheric nitrogen into a usable form for plants, while the plants provide the bacteria with nutrients and protection. The bacteria convert atmospheric nitrogen into a usable forms like ammonia that plants can absorb and use to build amino acids and other important organic compounds. Bacteria enter the plant roots and form specialized structures called root nodules, where nitrogen fixation takes place. Nitrogen fixation is a crucial natural process for providing plants with nitrogen, an essential element for growth and development. In agriculture, it utilizes nitrogen-fixing bacteria like Rhizobium to create a reduction in synthetic nitrogen fertilizers colonizing the roots of the plant to form nodules where they convert atmospheric nitrogen into forms usable by the plant, thus improving soil fertility and plant growth. As the plant grows and dies, it releases the fixed nitrogen back into the soil, enriching it with a readily available source of nitrogen. This also contributes to increased soil organic matter, which helps in water retention and nutrient cycling.

=== Hawaiian Bobtail Squid and Vibrio fischeri ===
The squid harbors Vibrio fischeri bacteria in a specialized light organ. The bacteria provide bioluminescence, which helps the squid camouflage against predators by mimicking moonlight. The Hawaiian bobtail squid and the bioluminescent bacterium Vibrio fischeri have a unique and beneficial symbiotic relationship. The bacteria resides within the squid's light organ. In exchange for a sustainable habitat, bacteria produce light to help the squid camouflage itself. Researchers use knowledge of this relationship with V. fischeri symbiosis to understand how the squid controls the light output and to potentially discover new drugs with antibacterial or anti-fungal properties.

=== Parasitic Wasp Asobara tabida and Wolbachia ===
The parasitic wasp Asobara tabida and its symbiont, the bacteria Wolbachia, offer potential future benefits in pest control and disease management. A. tabida relies on Wolbachia for oogenesis and is highly selective in its host choice, making it a valuable tool for biological control. Wolbachia can also be used to control vector-borne diseases by interfering with the reproduction and fitness of disease-carrying insects. Since the female parasitic wasps cannot develop without being infected with Wolbachia bacteria, it is important to understand why this obligate symbiosis can lead to insights into reproductive biology and pest control strategies.

=== Mycorrhizal Symbiosis between Plants and Fungi ===
Mycorrhizal fungi form symbiotic relationships with plant roots, enhancing nutrient and water uptake. Mycorrhizal fungi extend the plant's root system, increasing its ability to absorb water and essential nutrients like phosphorus, nitrogen, and micronutrients from the soil. By improving nutrient and water uptake, mycorrhizal symbiosis promotes plant growth, development, and yield, especially in challenging soil conditions. This symbiosis is crucial for agriculture and ecosystem health, and researchers are studying it to improve crop yields and soil health.

=== Benefits of Future Research ===
Researching the human microbiome, including the role of symbiotic bacteria in health and disease, has significant implications for human health and well-being. Humans harbor a diverse community of bacteria and other microbes in their gut and on their skin, which play a role in digestion, immunity, and overall health. Scientists and researchers study the human microbiome to understand its role in various diseases and to develop and improve treatments. Understanding how symbiotic microbes provide defense against pathogens and environmental stress can lead to new strategies for plant and animal health. For example, studying the evolution and development of specialized organs that house symbionts, like those in corals or insects, can reveal how host-symbiont interactions drive adaptation. Such future research into developmental symbiosis promises to reveal how interactions between organisms and their symbionts influence development, adaptation, and evolution.

== See also ==
- Symbiosis
- Developmental Biology
- Symbiosis in Lichens
- Symbiogenesis
