= Leukotriene C4 hydrolase =

Leukotriene-C4 hydrolase

Identifiers
- EC no.: 3.4.19.14

Databases
- IntEnz: IntEnz view
- BRENDA: BRENDA entry
- ExPASy: NiceZyme view
- KEGG: KEGG entry
- MetaCyc: metabolic pathway
- PRIAM: profile
- PDB structures: RCSB PDB PDBe PDBsum
Search
- PMC: articles
- PubMed: articles
- NCBI: proteins

Leukotriene-C4 hydrolase (EC 3.4.19.14, gamma-glutamyl leukotrienase) is an enzyme. Gamma-glutamyltransferase 5 (GGT5) is a human gene which encodes an enzyme protein that belongs to this class of enzymes. This enzyme catalyses the following chemical reaction

leukotriene C4 + H_{2}O $\rightleftharpoons$ leukotriene D4 + L-glutamate

The mouse enzyme is specific for leukotriene C4.
