= Nanaerobe =

Nanaerobes are organisms that cannot grow in the presence of micromolar concentrations of oxygen, but can grow with and benefit from the presence of nanomolar concentrations of oxygen (e.g. Bacteroides fragilis). Like other anaerobes, these organisms do not require oxygen for growth. This growth benefit requires the expression of an oxygen respiratory chain that is typically associated with microaerophilic respiration. Recent studies suggest that respiration in low concentrations of oxygen is an ancient process which predates the emergence of oxygenic photosynthesis.
