= Bile acid-CoA:amino acid N-acyltransferase =

Enzyme

glycine N-choloyltransferase

Identifiers
- EC no.: 2.3.1.65
- CAS no.: 74506-32-4

Databases
- IntEnz: IntEnz view
- BRENDA: BRENDA entry
- ExPASy: NiceZyme view
- KEGG: KEGG entry
- MetaCyc: metabolic pathway
- PRIAM: profile
- PDB structures: RCSB PDB PDBe PDBsum
- Gene Ontology: AmiGO / QuickGO
Search
- PMC: articles
- PubMed: articles
- NCBI: proteins

In enzymology, a bile acid-CoA:amino acid N-acyltransferase (EC 2.3.1.65) is an enzyme that catalyzes the chemical reaction

choloyl-CoA + glycine $\rightleftharpoons$ CoA + glycocholate

Thus, the two substrates of this enzyme are choloyl-CoA and glycine, whereas its two products are CoA and glycocholate.

This enzyme belongs to the family of transferases, specifically those acyltransferases transferring groups other than aminoacyl groups. The systematic name of this enzyme class is choloyl-CoA:glycine N-choloyltransferase. Other names in common use include glycine-taurine N-acyltransferase, amino acid N-choloyltransferase, BAT, glycine N-choloyltransferase, BACAT, cholyl-CoA glycine-taurine N-acyltransferase, and cholyl-CoA:taurine N-acyltransferase. This enzyme participates in bile acid biosynthesis and taurine and hypotaurine metabolism.
