= Acyl-homoserine lactone acylase =

Acyl-homoserine lactone acylase may refer to:

- Quorum-quenching N-acyl-homoserine lactonase, an enzyme
- Acyl-homoserine-lactone acylase, an enzyme
