= AIID =

AIID may refer to:

- Autoimmune disease
- Acyl-homoserine-lactone acylase, an enzyme
- AI Incident Database
