= N-acylethanolamine acid amidase =

Enzyme found in humans

NAAA

Identifiers
- Aliases: NAAA, ASAHL, PLT, N-acylethanolamine acid amidase
- External IDs: OMIM: 607469; MGI: 1914361; GeneCards: NAAA
Enzyme activity
EC #	BRENDA	ExPASy	KEGG	MetaCyc
3.5.1.23	↗	↗	↗	↗
3.5.1.60	↗	↗	↗	↗

Gene location (Human)
Chr.	Chromosome 4 (human)
Band	4q21.1	Start	75,913,660 bp
Band	4q21.1	End	75,941,013 bp

Gene location (Mouse)
Chr.	Chromosome 5 (mouse)
Band	5|5 E2	Start	92,405,518 bp
Band	5|5 E2	End	92,426,029 bp
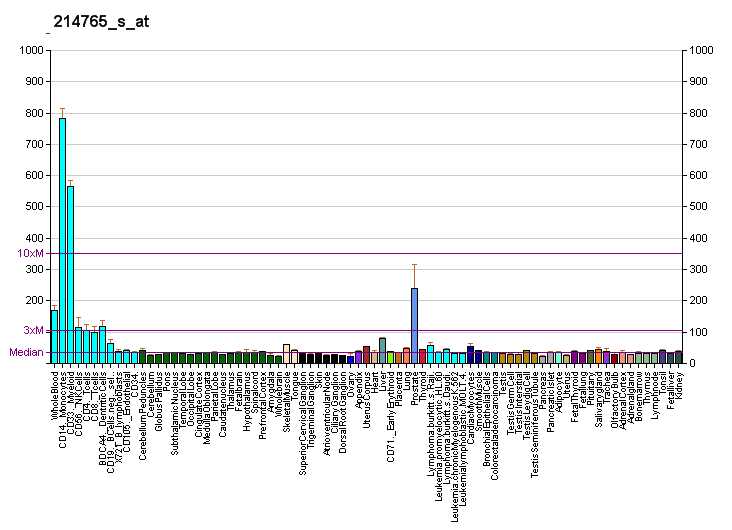
RNA expression pattern
Bgee	Human / Mouse (ortholog); Top expressed in: monocyte; granulocyte; rectum; mucosa of transverse colon; spleen; mucosa of sigmoid colon; blood; lymph node; minor salivary glands; olfactory zone of nasal mucosa / Top expressed in: choroidal fissure; tail of embryo; lip; yolk sac; Epithelium of choroid plexus; lumbar spinal ganglion; granulocyte; white adipose tissue; spleen; mesenteric lymph nodes; More reference expression data
BioGPS	More reference expression data
Gene ontology
Molecular function	transcription factor binding; hydrolase activity; hydrolase activity, acting on carbon-nitrogen (but not peptide) bonds; fatty acid amide hydrolase activity
Cellular component	cytoplasm; lysosome; extracellular exosome; lysosomal lumen; presynapse; extrinsic component of membrane; membrane
Biological process	lipid metabolism; neurotransmitter secretion; biological process; fatty acid metabolic process; N-acylethanolamine metabolic process; lipid catabolic process
Sources:Amigo / QuickGO
Orthologs
Databases	NCBI: entry; OMA: entry
Species	Human	Mouse
Entrez	27163	67111
Ensembl	ENSG00000138744	ENSMUSG00000029413
UniProt	Q02083	Q9D7V9
RefSeq (mRNA)	NM_001042402; NM_014435; NM_001363719	NM_001163687; NM_025972
RefSeq (protein)	NP_001035861; NP_055250; NP_001350648	NP_001157159; NP_080248
Location (UCSC)	Chr 4: 75.91 – 75.94 Mb	Chr 5: 92.41 – 92.43 Mb
PubMed search
- Wikidata
View/Edit Human	View/Edit Mouse

N-acylethanolamine-hydrolyzing acid amidase is an enzyme that in humans is encoded by the NAAA gene. The enzyme NAAA is a member of the choloylglycine hydrolase family, a subset of the N-terminal nucleophile hydrolase superfamily. NAAA has a molecular weight of 31 kDa. The activation and inhibition of its catalytic site is of medical interest as a potential treatment for obesity and chronic pain. This gene encodes an N-acylethanolamine-hydrolyzing enzyme which is highly similar to acid ceramidase. Multiple transcript variants encoding different isoforms have been found for this gene.

== Mechanism ==
The overall enzyme mechanism involves cleavage into two chains, one of which contains the catalytic nucleophile, believed to be a cysteine residue. Unlike FAAH, which operates in basic conditions, this enzyme must operate under acidic conditions (pH ~4.5), and is completely inactivated at a pH of 8. Selective inhibitors of NAAA are ester and amide compounds, such as N-cyclohexanecarbonylpentadecylamine. NAAA is cleaved proteolytically at residue Cys-126. NAAA cleaves C-N non-peptide bonds in linear amides, particularly ethanolamides. Its mechanism is quite similar to that of AC, which is further supported by AC's ability to cleave N-acylethanolamines (NAEs), albeit at far lower rates and with different specificities. While mechanistic details are not very well known, catalytic activity of NAAA is thought to be activated by Cys-126 and Asp-145.

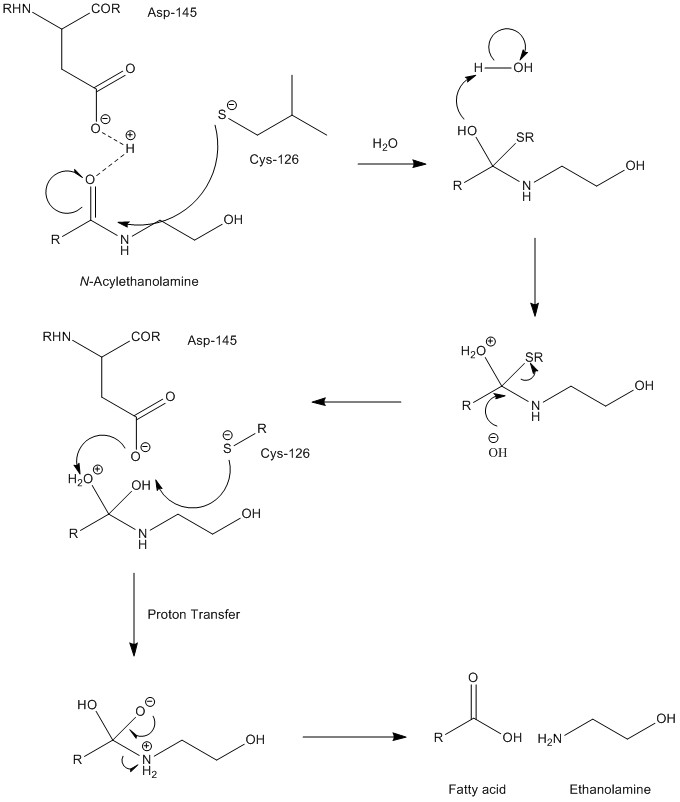
This is the speculated mechanism for the hydrolysis of ethanolamides by NAAA, which is very similar to that of acid ceramise.

== Structure ==
NAAA belongs to the N-terminal nucleophile (Ntn) hydrolase superfamily. It undergoes proteolytic self-cleavage at acidic pH to generate an active heterodimer (alpha- and beta-subunits), exposing the catalytic Cys126 residue at the N-terminus of the beta-subunit. The structures reveal that upon interaction with lipid membranes or detergent environments, a conformational shift opens up a deep, narrow hydrophobic pocket designed to accommodate the acyl chains of endogenous fatty acid ethanolamides (such as PEA). The available PDB structures capture NAAA in various functional states—ranging from its zymogen form to active complexes bound to fatty acids, reversible inhibitors, and covalent adducts

== Biological function ==
Fatty acid ethanolamines (FAEs) perform several physiological functions, most notably serving as messengers for pain and inflammation. NAAA's are found primarily in the lysosomal compartment of macrophages, in line with most inflammation-related proteins. The gene that codes for the protein is 4q21.1. There, they perform FAE hydrolysis, the final step in the signaling cascade for pain and inflammation, yielding an ethanolamine and a fatty acid. While it processes the cleavage of many different substrates, NAAA is most active with the substrate N-palmitoylethanolamine, suggesting that this is one of the key messengers of pain. NAAA activity in rats is highest in the lungs, while in humans it is highest in the liver, so there is cross-species variability in the enzyme's selective activity.

== Disease relevance ==
Recent studies suggest that NAAA has significance in two widespread human conditions: chronic pain and obesity. Current research focuses on inhibiting the NAAA hydrolytic active site in order to control inflammation. It is still ambiguous as to whether reduced inflammation is correlated to reduced pain. ARN077, a β-lactone, has been one of the most intensely tested NAAA inhibitors, with the strongest promise of inhibition, as it blocks the catalytic cysteine via a thioester bond. The lack of homology between NAAA and FAAH makes NAAA-specific targeting drugs far more feasible. However, because the fatty acid concentration circulating throughout one's bloodstream is positively correlated with obesity, decreased NAAA activity is thought to be correlated with obesity.

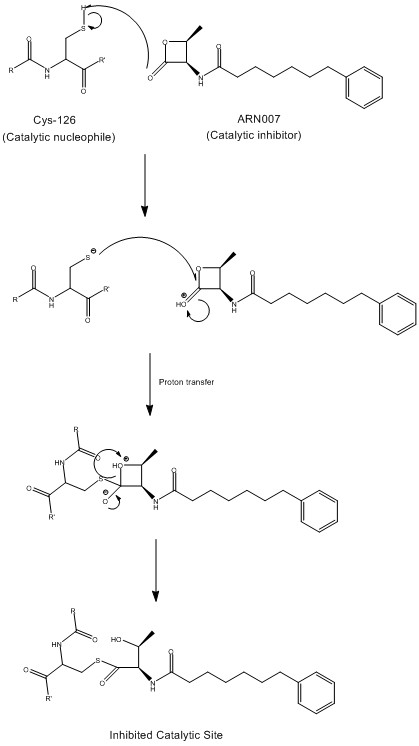
This mechanism shows the inhibition of the catalytic cysteine by the most-tested β-lactone, ARN077.

== Industrial relevance ==
While no drugs targeting NAAA have entered the market yet, there is currently substantial research being done on the activation, and specific targeting and inhibition of NAAA. Activation of NAAA is spurred by the addition of phospholipids, and targeted inhibition by different buffers. Findings in these areas may be able to develop drugs to combat chronic pain and obesity.

== Evolution ==
While NAAA operates much like fatty acid amide hydrolase (HUGO gene symbol: FAAH), the two enzymes are not homologous.

On the other hand, NAAA is homologous to acid ceramidase (HUGO gene symbol: ASAH1), sharing 30% sequence identity at the amino acid level in humans ENSEMBL.

== Historical significance ==
NAAA was discovered in 2007 as an alternative source of anandamide hydrolysis. Previously, FAAH was the only known enzyme to be responsible for the degradation of these endocannabinoids, functioning in a pH range of 8.5-10. NAAA's discovery served as an explanation for endocannabinoids and anti-inflammatory ethanolamines in acidic environments, as its peak functionality is found at a pH ~4.5-5. Because of its functional role similar to FAAH, it offers another option for drug development.

== See also ==
- Choloylglycine hydrolase family
- Ethanolamine
- Macrophage
- Lactone
- Cannabinoid
- Cannabinoid receptor
- ASAH1
