= Gamma-glutamyltransferase =

Class of enzymes

Gamma-glutamyl transpeptidase

Identifiers
- Symbol: G_glu_transpept
- Pfam: PF01019
- InterPro: IPR000101
- PROSITE: PDOC00404
- Membranome: 274
Available protein structures:
- PDB: IPR000101 PF01019 (ECOD; PDBsum)
- AlphaFold: IPR000101; PF01019

Gamma-glutamyltransferase
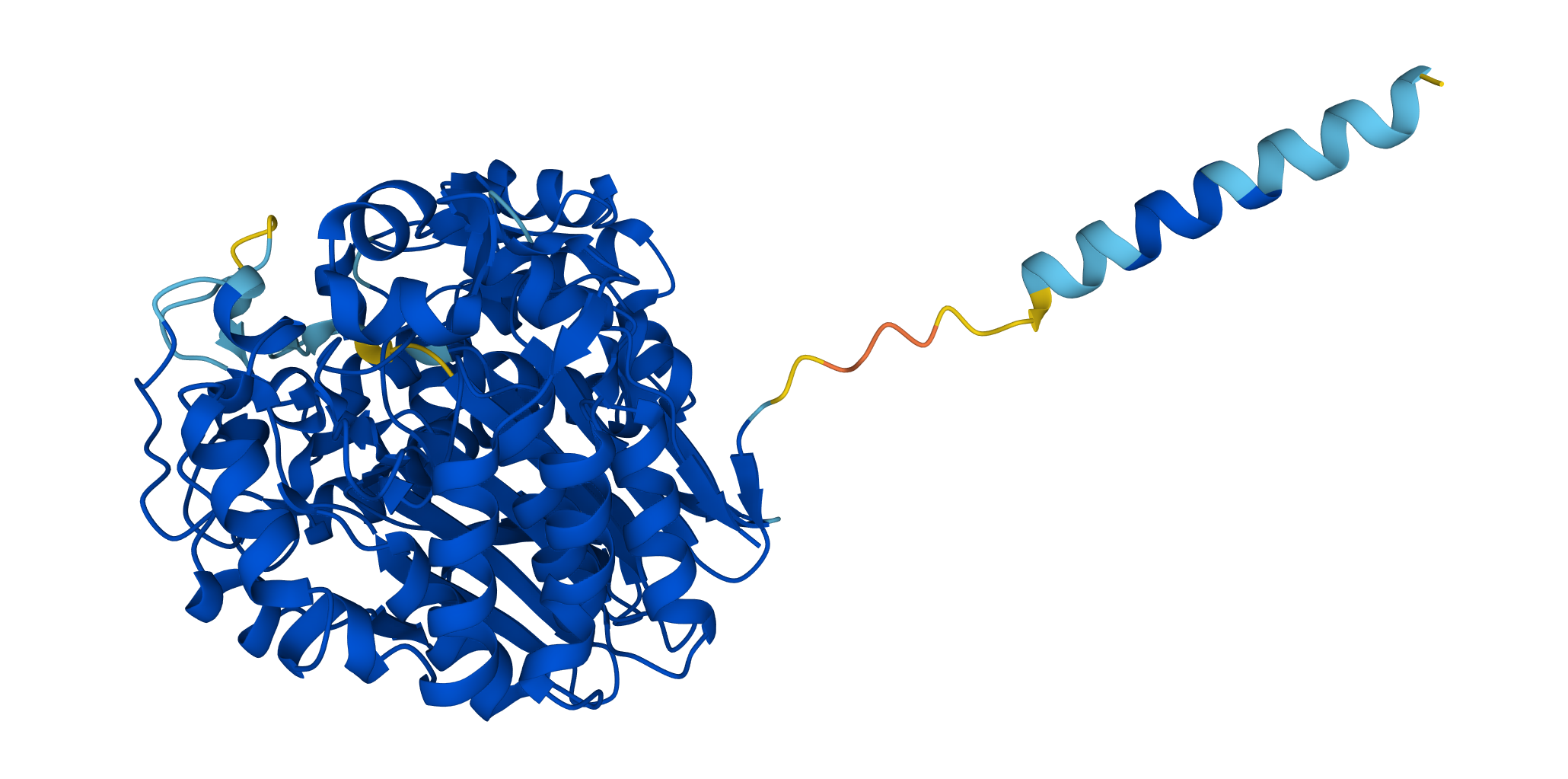

Identifiers
- EC no.: 2.3.2.2
- CAS no.: 9046-27-9

Databases
- BRENDA: enzyme data
- ExPASy: NiceZyme view
- KEGG: enzyme entry
- MetaCyc: metabolic pathway
- Rhea: reactions
- PDB structures: RCSB PDB PDBe PDBsum
- Gene Ontology: AmiGO / QuickGO
Search
- PMC: articles
- PubMed: articles
- NCBI: proteins

gamma-glutamyltransferase 1

Identifiers
- Symbol: GGT1
- Alt. symbols: GGT
- NCBI gene: 2678
- HGNC: 4250
- OMIM: 231950
- RefSeq: NM_001032364
- UniProt: P19440

Other data
- EC number: 2.3.2.2
- Locus: Chr. 22 q11.1-11.2
Search for
- Structures: Swiss-model
- Domains: InterPro

gamma-glutamyltransferase 2

Identifiers
- Symbol: GGT2
- Alt. symbols: GGT
- NCBI gene: 2679
- HGNC: 4251
- OMIM: 137181
- RefSeq: NM_002058
- UniProt: P36268

Other data
- EC number: 2.3.2.2
- Locus: Chr. 22 q11.1-11.2
Search for
- Structures: Swiss-model
- Domains: InterPro

Gamma-glutamyltransferase (also γ-glutamyltransferase, GGT, gamma-GT, gamma-glutamyl transpeptidase; EC 2.3.2.2) is a transferase (a type of enzyme) that catalyzes the transfer of gamma-glutamyl functional groups from molecules such as glutathione to an acceptor that may be an amino acid, a peptide or water (forming glutamate). GGT plays a key role in the gamma-glutamyl cycle, a pathway for the synthesis and degradation of glutathione as well as drug and xenobiotic detoxification. Other lines of evidence indicate that GGT can also exert a pro-oxidant role, with regulatory effects at various levels in cellular signal transduction and cellular pathophysiology. This transferase is found in many tissues, the most notable one being the liver, and has significance in medicine as a diagnostic marker.

== Nomenclature ==
The name γ-glutamyltransferase is preferred by the Nomenclature Committee of the International Union of Biochemistry and Molecular Biology. The Expert Panel on Enzymes of the International Federation of Clinical Chemistry also used this name. The older name is gamma-glutamyl transpeptidase (GGTP).

== Function ==
GGT is present in the cell membranes of many tissues, including the kidneys, bile duct, pancreas, gallbladder, spleen, heart, brain, and seminal vesicles. It is involved in the transfer of amino acids across the cellular membrane and leukotriene metabolism. It is also involved in glutathione metabolism by transferring the glutamyl moiety to a variety of acceptor molecules including water, certain L-amino acids, and peptides, leaving the cysteine product to preserve intracellular homeostasis of oxidative stress. This general reaction is:

(5-L-glutamyl)-peptide + an amino acid ⇌ peptide + 5-L-glutamyl amino acid

== Biochemistry ==
In prokaryotes and eukaryotes, GGT consists of two polypeptide chains, a heavy and a light subunit, processed from a single chain precursor by an autocatalytic cleavage. The active site of GGT is known to be located in the light subunit.

Co-translational N-glycosylation serves a significant role in the proper autocatalytic cleavage and proper folding of GGT. Single site mutations at asparagine residues were shown to result in a functionally active yet slightly less thermally stable version of the enzyme in vitro, while knockout of all asparagine residues resulted in an accumulation of the uncleaved, propeptide form of the enzyme.

== Clinical significance ==
A GGT test is predominantly used as a diagnostic marker for liver disease. Elevated serum GGT activity can be found in diseases of the liver, biliary system, pancreas and kidneys. Latent elevations in GGT are typically seen in patients with chronic viral hepatitis infections often taking 12 months or more to present.

Individual test results should always be interpreted using the reference range from the laboratory that performed the test, though example reference ranges are 15–85 IU/L for men, and 5–55 IU/L for women. GGT is similar to alkaline phosphatase (ALP) in detecting disease of the biliary tract. Indeed, the two markers correlate well, though there are conflicting data about whether GGT has better sensitivity. In general, ALP is still the first test for biliary disease. The main value of GGT is in verifying that ALP elevations are, in fact, due to biliary disease; ALP can also be increased in certain bone diseases, but GGT is not.

=== Alcohol use ===
GGT is elevated by ingestion of large quantities of alcohol. However, determination of high levels of total serum GGT activity is not specific to alcohol intoxication, and the measurement of selected serum forms of the enzyme offer more specific information. Isolated elevation or disproportionate elevation compared to other liver enzymes (such as ALT or alanine transaminase) can indicate harmful alcohol use or alcoholic liver disease, and can indicate excess alcohol consumption up to 3 or 4 weeks prior to the test. The mechanism for this elevation is unclear. Alcohol might increase GGT production by inducing hepatic microsomal production, or it might cause the leakage of GGT from hepatocytes.

=== Xenobiotics ===
Numerous drugs can raise GGT levels, including phenobarbitone, phenytoin and carbamazepine. GGT elevation has also been occasionally reported following nonsteroidal anti-inflammatory drugs (including aspirin), St. John's wort and kava.

=== Cardiovascular disease ===
More recently, slightly elevated serum GGT has also been found to correlate with cardiovascular diseases and is under active investigation as a cardiovascular risk marker. GGT in fact accumulates in atherosclerotic plaques, suggesting a potential role in pathogenesis of cardiovascular diseases, and circulates in blood in the form of distinct protein aggregates, some of which appear to be related to specific pathologies such as metabolic syndrome, alcohol addiction and chronic liver disease.

Elevated levels of GGT can also be due to congestive heart failure.

=== Neoplasms ===
GGT is expressed in high levels in many different tumors. It is known to accelerate tumor growth and to increase resistance to cisplatin in tumors.

== Examples ==
Human proteins that belong to this family include GGT1, GGT2, GGT6, GGTL3, GGTL4, GGTLA1 and GGTLA4.
