= Choloylglycine hydrolase =

Class of enzymes

Identifiers
- EC no.: 3.5.1.24
- CAS no.: 37289-07-9

Databases
- BRENDA: enzyme data
- ExPASy: NiceZyme view
- KEGG: enzyme entry
- MetaCyc: metabolic pathway
- Rhea: reactions
- PDB structures: RCSB PDB PDBe PDBsum
- Gene Ontology: AmiGO / QuickGO
Search
- PMC: articles
- PubMed: articles
- NCBI: proteins

Choloylglycine hydrolase (EC 3.5.1.24) is an enzyme that catalyzes the chemical reaction

glycocholic acid
H_{2}O
cholic acid
+
glycine

The enzyme characterised from Clostridium perfringens and Bacteroides fragilis hydrolyses the bile acid, glycocholic acid, to cholic acid and glycine. Other amide derivatives of cholic acid are also substrates. In humans, the enzyme is an important component of the gut microbiome, where it metabolises many bile acids.

This enzyme is a hydrolase, one acting on carbon-nitrogen bonds other than peptide bonds, specifically in linear amides. The systematic name of this enzyme class is 3alpha,7alpha,12alpha-trihydroxy-5beta-cholan-24-oylglycine amidohydrolase. Other names in common use include glycocholase, bile salt hydrolase, and choloyltaurine hydrolase.

== Structural studies ==
As of late 2007, 4 structures have been solved for this class of enzymes, with PDB accession codes PDB: 2BJF, PDB: 2BJG, PDB: 2HEZ, and PDB: 2HF0.
