= Spinal muscular atrophy with progressive myoclonic epilepsy =

Rare neurodegenerative disease

- Other names: Hereditary myoclonus-progressive distal muscular atrophy syndrome
- This condition is inherited in an autosomal recessive manner.
- Specialty: Neurology

Spinal muscular atrophy with progressive myoclonic epilepsy (SMA-PME), sometimes called Jankovic–Rivera syndrome, is a very rare neurodegenerative disease whose symptoms include slowly progressive muscle loss (atrophy), predominantly affecting proximal muscles, combined with denervation and myoclonic seizures. Only 12 known human families are described in scientific literature to have SMA-PME.

SMA-PME is associated with a missense mutation (c.125C→T) or deletion in exon 2 of the ASAH1 gene and is inherited in an autosomal recessive manner. SMA-PME is closely related to a lysosomal disorder disease called Farber lipogranulomatosis. As with many genetic disorders, there is no known cure for SMA-PME.

The condition was first described in 1979 by American researchers Joseph Jankovic and Victor M. Rivera.

== ASAH1 gene ==
The ASAH1 gene codes for acid ceramidase, an enzyme found in lysosomes. The lysosome breaks down acid ceramidase; the fatty acid component is then used to produce myelin. Myelin is an insulating coating around the neurons in the body which helps to contain bioelectrical signals along a nerve cell's axon and increase transmission rate. In patients with SMA-PME, the ceramidase function decreases to 33.33% effective. The lack of myelin resulting from the lack of acid ceramidase breakdown leads to nerve cell dysfunction.

== See also ==
- Spinal muscular atrophies
- Progressive myoclonus epilepsy
