= Gamma-glutamyltransferase 7 =

Protein-coding gene in the species Homo sapiens

GGT7

Identifiers
- Aliases: GGT7, D20S101, GGT4, GGTL3, GGTL5, dJ18C9.2, gamma-glutamyltransferase 7
- External IDs: OMIM: 612342; MGI: 1913385; HomoloGene: 70866; GeneCards: GGT7; OMA:GGT7 - orthologs
- EC number: 3.4.19.13

Gene location (Human)
Chr.	Chromosome 20 (human)
Band	20q11.22	Start	34,844,720 bp
Band	20q11.22	End	34,872,856 bp

Gene location (Mouse)
Chr.	Chromosome 2 (mouse)
Band	2|2 H1	Start	155,490,379 bp
Band	2|2 H1	End	155,518,237 bp
RNA expression pattern
Bgee	Human / Mouse (ortholog); Top expressed in: right hemisphere of cerebellum; anterior pituitary; apex of heart; right frontal lobe; right lobe of thyroid gland; Brodmann area 9; left lobe of thyroid gland; gastrocnemius muscle; olfactory zone of nasal mucosa; gastric mucosa / Top expressed in: nasal epithelium; olfactory epithelium; superior frontal gyrus; primary visual cortex; cerebellar cortex; lateral geniculate nucleus; medial dorsal nucleus; medial geniculate nucleus; pontine nuclei; dentate gyrus of hippocampal formation granule cell; More reference expression data
BioGPS	n/a
Gene ontology
Molecular function	transferase activity; glutathione hydrolase activity; acyltransferase activity; protein binding; hydrolase activity; hypoglycin A gamma-glutamyl transpeptidase activity; leukotriene C4 gamma-glutamyl transferase activity; peptidyltransferase activity
Cellular component	integral component of membrane; membrane; plasma membrane
Biological process	glutathione biosynthetic process; proteolysis; glutathione catabolic process; glutathione metabolic process; leukotriene D4 biosynthetic process; negative regulation of response to oxidative stress; protein biosynthesis; cellular amino acid metabolic process; glutamate metabolic process; cysteine biosynthetic process
Sources:Amigo / QuickGO
Orthologs
Species	Human	Mouse
Entrez	2686	207182
Ensembl	ENSG00000131067	ENSMUSG00000027603
UniProt	Q9UJ14	Q99JP7
RefSeq (mRNA)	NM_178026; NM_001351702; NM_178025	NM_144786; NM_001362898; NM_001362900
RefSeq (protein)	NP_821158; NP_001338631; NP_821158.2	NP_659035; NP_001349827; NP_001349829
Location (UCSC)	Chr 20: 34.84 – 34.87 Mb	Chr 2: 155.49 – 155.52 Mb
PubMed search
- Wikidata
View/Edit Human	View/Edit Mouse

Gamma-glutamyltransferase 7 is an enzyme that in humans is encoded by the GGT7 gene.

== Function ==
Gamma-glutamyltransferase is a membrane-associated protein involved in both glutathione metabolism and the transpeptidation of amino acids. Changes in gamma-glutamyltransferase activity may signal preneoplastic or toxic conditions in the liver or kidney. The protein encoded by this gene is similar in sequence to gamma-glutamyltransferase, but its function is unknown.
