= Gamma-glutamyltransferase 6 =

Protein-coding gene in the species Homo sapiens

GGT6

Identifiers
- Aliases: GGT6, gamma-glutamyltransferase 6
- External IDs: OMIM: 612341; MGI: 1918772; HomoloGene: 51918; GeneCards: GGT6; OMA:GGT6 - orthologs
- EC number: 3.4.19.13

Gene location (Human)
Chr.	Chromosome 17 (human)
Band	17p13.2	Start	4,556,927 bp
Band	17p13.2	End	4,560,818 bp

Gene location (Mouse)
Chr.	Chromosome 11 (mouse)
Band	11|11 B4	Start	72,326,352 bp
Band	11|11 B4	End	72,329,226 bp
RNA expression pattern
Bgee	Human / Mouse (ortholog); Top expressed in: pancreatic ductal cell; skin of arm; mucosa of transverse colon; nasal epithelium; mucosa of ileum; parotid gland; skin of abdomen; skin of leg; rectum; body of pancreas / Top expressed in: lip; left colon; Paneth cell; esophagus; jejunum; left lobe of liver; ileum; right kidney; skin of external ear; proximal tubule; More reference expression data
BioGPS	n/a
Gene ontology
Molecular function	transferase activity; glutathione hydrolase activity; acyltransferase activity; hydrolase activity; hypoglycin A gamma-glutamyl transpeptidase activity; molecular function; leukotriene C4 gamma-glutamyl transferase activity
Cellular component	integral component of membrane; extracellular exosome; membrane
Biological process	glutathione biosynthetic process; proteolysis; glutathione catabolic process; glutathione metabolic process; leukotriene D4 biosynthetic process; biological process
Sources:Amigo / QuickGO
Orthologs
Species	Human	Mouse
Entrez	124975	71522
Ensembl	ENSG00000167741	ENSMUSG00000040471
UniProt	Q6P531	Q6PDE7
RefSeq (mRNA)	NM_153338; NM_001122890; NM_001288702; NM_001288703; NM_001288704	NM_027819
RefSeq (protein)	NP_001116362; NP_001275631; NP_001275632; NP_001275633; NP_699169	NP_082095
Location (UCSC)	Chr 17: 4.56 – 4.56 Mb	Chr 11: 72.33 – 72.33 Mb
PubMed search
- Wikidata
View/Edit Human	View/Edit Mouse

Gamma-glutamyltransferase 6 is a protein that in humans is encoded by the GGT6 gene.

== Function ==
GGT6 belongs to the gamma-glutamyltransferase (GGT; EC 2.3.2.2) gene family. GGT is a membrane-bound extracellular enzyme that cleaves gamma-glutamyl peptide bonds in glutathione and other peptides and transfers the gamma-glutamyl moiety to acceptors. GGT is also key to glutathione homeostasis because it provides substrates for glutathione synthesis (Heisterkamp et al., 2008 [PubMed 18357469]).
