= ASRGL1 =

Protein-coding gene in humans

Identifiers
- Aliases: ASRGL1, ALP, ALP1, CRASH, asparaginase like 1, asparaginase and isoaspartyl peptidase 1
- External IDs: OMIM: 609212; MGI: 1913764; GeneCards: ASRGL1
Available structures
PDB	Ortholog search: PDBe RCSB
PDB	List of PDB id codes 3TKJ, 4ET0, 4O0C, 4O0D, 4O0E, 4O0F, 4O0G, 4O0H, 4OSX, 4OSY, 4PVP, 4PVQ, 4PVR, 4PVS, 4ZM9
Enzyme activity
EC #	BRENDA	ExPASy	KEGG	MetaCyc
3.4.19.5	↗	↗	↗	↗
3.5.1.1	↗	↗	↗	↗

Gene location (Human)
Chr.	Chromosome 11 (human)
Band	11q12.3	Start	62,337,448 bp
Band	11q12.3	End	62,393,412 bp

Gene location (Mouse)
Chr.	Chromosome 19 (mouse)
Band	19|19 A	Start	9,087,232 bp
Band	19|19 A	End	9,113,000 bp
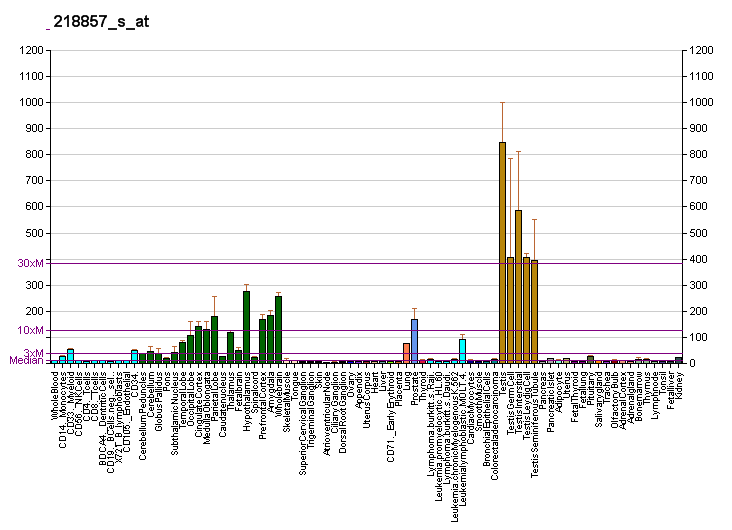
RNA expression pattern
Bgee	Human / Mouse (ortholog); Top expressed in: sperm; putamen; right uterine tube; pars reticulata; left testis; nasal epithelium; ventral tegmental area; right testis; amygdala; cerebellar vermis / Top expressed in: seminiferous tubule; spermatocyte; neural layer of retina; spermatid; motor neuron; substantia nigra; supraoptic nucleus; dentate gyrus of hippocampal formation granule cell; suprachiasmatic nucleus; deep cerebellar nuclei; More reference expression data
BioGPS	More reference expression data
Gene ontology
Molecular function	peptidase activity; beta-aspartyl-peptidase activity; hydrolase activity; N4-(beta-N-acetylglucosaminyl)-L-asparaginase activity; asparaginase activity
Cellular component	cytoplasm; cytosol; nucleus; photoreceptor inner segment
Biological process	asparagine catabolic process via L-aspartate; L-phenylalanine catabolic process; proteolysis; protein maturation
Sources:Amigo / QuickGO
Orthologs
Databases	NCBI: entry; OMA: entry
Species	Human	Mouse
Entrez	80150	66514
Ensembl	ENSG00000162174	ENSMUSG00000024654
UniProt	Q7L266	Q8C0M9
RefSeq (mRNA)	NM_001083926; NM_025080	NM_025610
RefSeq (protein)	NP_001077395; NP_079356	NP_079886
Location (UCSC)	Chr 11: 62.34 – 62.39 Mb	Chr 19: 9.09 – 9.11 Mb
PubMed search
- Wikidata
View/Edit Human	View/Edit Mouse

L-asparaginase is an enzyme that in humans is encoded by the ASRGL1 gene.

== Tissue distribution ==
According to antibody-based profiling and transcriptomics analysis, ASRGL1 protein is present in all analysed human tissues, with highest expression in brain, in female tissues such as the uterine cervix and fallopian tube, and in male tissues as testis. Based on confocal microscopy ASRGL1 is mainly localized to the microtubules.

== Structure ==
The ASRGL1 protein consists of 308 amino acids and is activated by autocleavage at amino acid 168 to form an alpha- and a beta-chain, which can dimerize into a heterodimer.

== Function ==
The ASRGL1 enzyme has both L-asparaginase and beta-aspartyl peptidase activity and may be involved in the production of L-aspartate, which can act as an excitatory neurotransmitter in some brain regions.

== Clinical significance ==
ASRGL1 is highly expressed in the normal endometrium and differentially expressed in endometrial cancer. Loss of ASRGL1 expression is an unfavorable prognostic feature for patients with endometrial cancer.
