= Gamma-glutamyltransferase 1 =

Protein-coding gene in the species Homo sapiens

GGT1

Identifiers
- Aliases: GGT1, CD224, D22S672, D22S732, GGT, GGT 1, GTG, gamma-glutamyltransferase 1, GGTD
- External IDs: OMIM: 612346; MGI: 95706; GeneCards: GGT1
Available structures
PDB	Ortholog search: PDBe RCSB
PDB	List of PDB id codes 4GDX, 4GG2, 4Z9O, 4ZBK, 4ZC6, 4ZCG
Enzyme activity
EC #	BRENDA	ExPASy	KEGG	MetaCyc
2.3.2.2	↗	↗	↗	↗
3.4.19.13	↗	↗	↗	↗
3.4.19.14	↗	↗	↗	↗

Gene location (Human)
Chr.	Chromosome 22 (human)
Band	22q11.23	Start	24,594,811 bp
Band	22q11.23	End	24,629,005 bp

Gene location (Mouse)
Chr.	Chromosome 10 (mouse)
Band	10|10 C1	Start	75,561,604 bp
Band	10|10 C1	End	75,586,200 bp
RNA expression pattern
Bgee	Human / Mouse (ortholog); Top expressed in: right lobe of liver; mucosa of transverse colon; gallbladder; right lung; body of pancreas; upper lobe of left lung; right lobe of thyroid gland; human kidney; left lobe of thyroid gland; gonad / Top expressed in: right kidney; proximal tubule; human kidney; intestinal villus; duodenum; seminal vesicula; epithelium of small intestine; jejunum; decidua; efferent ductule; More reference expression data
BioGPS	n/a
Gene ontology
Molecular function	transferase activity; peptidase activity; protein binding; acyltransferase activity; hydrolase activity; glutathione hydrolase activity; hypoglycin A gamma-glutamyl transpeptidase activity; peptidyltransferase activity; leukotriene-C(4) hydrolase; leukotriene C4 gamma-glutamyl transferase activity
Cellular component	integral component of membrane; membrane; plasma membrane; extracellular exosome; extracellular space
Biological process	leukotriene metabolic process; zymogen activation; glutathione biosynthetic process; regulation of immune system process; cysteine biosynthetic process; spermatogenesis; regulation of inflammatory response; xenobiotic metabolic process; glutamate metabolic process; glutathione catabolic process; proteolysis; cellular amino acid metabolic process; glutathione metabolic process; fatty acid metabolic process; leukotriene D4 biosynthetic process; protein biosynthesis; peptide modification; response to estradiol; response to lipopolysaccharide; response to tumor necrosis factor
Sources:Amigo / QuickGO
Orthologs
Databases	NCBI: entry; OMA: entry
Species	Human	Mouse
Entrez	2678	14598
Ensembl	ENSG00000100031	ENSMUSG00000006345
UniProt	P19440	Q60928
RefSeq (mRNA)	NM_013430; NM_001032364; NM_001032365; NM_001288833; NM_005265 NM_013421	NM_008116; NM_001305992
RefSeq (protein)	NP_001275762; NP_038265; NP_038347	NP_001292921; NP_032142; NP_001366466; NP_001366467; NP_001366468 NP_001366469; NP_001366470
Location (UCSC)	Chr 22: 24.59 – 24.63 Mb	Chr 10: 75.56 – 75.59 Mb
PubMed search
- Wikidata
View/Edit Human	View/Edit Mouse

Gamma-glutamyltransferase 1 (GGT1), also known as CD224 (Cluster of Differentiation 224), is a human gene.

== Function ==
Human gamma-glutamyltransferase catalyzes the transfer of the glutamyl moiety of glutathione to a variety of amino acids and dipeptide acceptors. This heteroduplex enzyme is composed of a heavy chain and a light chain, which are derived from a single precursor protein, and is present in tissues involved in absorption and secretion. This enzyme is a member of the gamma-glutamyltransferase protein family, of which many members have not yet been fully characterized. This gene encodes several transcript variants; studies suggest that many transcripts of this gene family may be non-functional or represent pseudogenes. The functional transcripts which have been fully characterized have been grouped and classified as type I gamma-glutamyltransferase. Complex splicing events may take place in a tissue-specific manner, resulting in marked dissimilarity in the 5' UTRs. Several 5' UTR transcript variants of the type I gene have been identified in different tissues and cancer cells.

== See also ==
- Cluster of differentiation
