= Glycocholic acid =

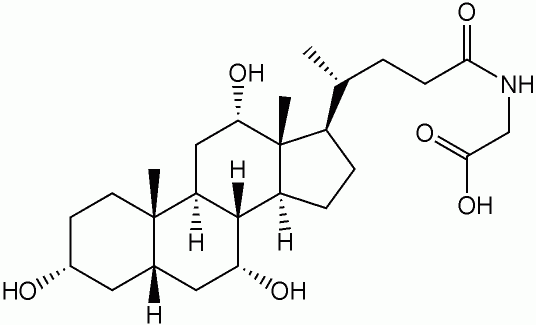
- Glycocholic acid

Names
- IUPAC name N-(3α,7α,12α-Trihydroxy-5β-cholan-24-oyl)glycine
- Systematic IUPAC name {(4R)-4-[(1R,3aS,3bR,4R,5aS,7R,9aS,9bS,11S,11aR)-4,7,11-Trihydroxy-9a,11a-dimethylhexadecahydro-1H-cyclopenta[a]phenanthren-1-yl]pentanamido}acetic acid

Identifiers
CAS Number	475-31-0
3D model (JSmol)	Interactive image
ChEBI	CHEBI:17687
ChEMBL	ChEMBL411070
ChemSpider	9734
ECHA InfoCard	100.006.815
IUPHAR/BPS	4544
KEGG	C01921
PubChem CID	10140
UNII	G59NX3I3RT
CompTox Dashboard (EPA)	DTXSID2047436
- InChI: InChI=1S/C26H43NO6/c1-14(4-7-22(31)27-13-23(32)33)17-5-6-18-24-19(12-21(30)26(17,18)3)25(2)9-8-16(28)10-15(25)11-20(24)29/h14-21,24,28-30H,4-13H2,1-3H3,(H,27,31)(H,32,33)/t14-,15+,16-,17-,18+,19+,20-,21+,24+,25+,26-/m1/s1 Key: RFDAIACWWDREDC-FRVQLJSFSA-N
- SMILES: C[C@H](CCC(=O)NCC(=O)O)[C@H]1CC[C@@H]2[C@@]1([C@H](C[C@H]3[C@H]2[C@@H](C[C@H]4[C@@]3(CC[C@H](C4)O)C)O)O)C

Properties
Chemical formula	C_{26}H_{43}NO_{6}
Molar mass	465.631 g·mol^{−1}
Melting point	130 °C (266 °F; 403 K)
- Except where otherwise noted, data are given for materials in their standard state (at 25 °C [77 °F], 100 kPa). Infobox references

Glycocholic acid, or cholylglycine, is a crystalline bile acid involved in the emulsification of fats. It occurs as a sodium salt in the bile of mammals. It is a conjugate of cholic acid with glycine. Its anion is called glycocholate.

== Metabolism ==
The enzyme choloylglycine hydrolase converts glycocholic acid, to cholic acid and glycine:

glycocholic acid
H_{2}O
cholic acid
+
glycine

In humans, the enzyme is an important component of the gut microbiome, where it metabolises many bile acids.

== Clinical significance ==
In a prospective study, positive associations were observed between prediagnostic plasma levels of seven conjugated bile acid metabolites, including glycocholic acid, and colon cancer risk. These findings support experimental data suggesting that high circulating bile acids promote colon cancer risk.

== See also ==
- Taurocholic acid
