= Spermine oxidase =

Identifiers
- EC no.: 1.5.3.16

Databases
- IntEnz: IntEnz view
- BRENDA: BRENDA entry
- ExPASy: NiceZyme view
- KEGG: KEGG entry
- MetaCyc: metabolic pathway
- PRIAM: profile
- PDB structures: RCSB PDB PDBe PDBsum
Search
- PMC: articles
- PubMed: articles
- NCBI: proteins

Spermine oxidase (EC 1.5.3.16, PAOh1/SMO, AtPAO1, AtPAO4, SMO) is an enzyme with systematic name spermidine:oxygen oxidoreductase (spermidine-forming). This enzyme catalyses the following chemical reaction

spermine
+ H_{2}O
O_{2}
H_{2}O_{2}
O_{2}
H_{2}O_{2}
spermidine
+
3-aminopropanal

The enzyme from Arabidopsis thaliana oxidizes norspermine to norspermidine.
