= Gamma-glutamyltransferase 5 =

Protein-coding gene in the species Homo sapiens

GGT5

Identifiers
- Aliases: GGT5, GGT-REL, GGTLA1, GGL, GGT 5, gamma-glutamyltransferase 5
- External IDs: OMIM: 137168; MGI: 1346063; HomoloGene: 55802; GeneCards: GGT5; OMA:GGT5 - orthologs
- EC number: 3.4.19.14

Gene location (Human)
| Chr. | Chromosome 22 (human) |
| Band | 22q11.23 | Start | 24,219,654 bp |
| Band | 22q11.23 | End | 24,245,108 bp |

Gene location (Mouse)
| Chr. | Chromosome 10 (mouse) |
| Band | 10|10 C1 | Start | 75,425,174 bp |
| Band | 10|10 C1 | End | 75,453,034 bp |
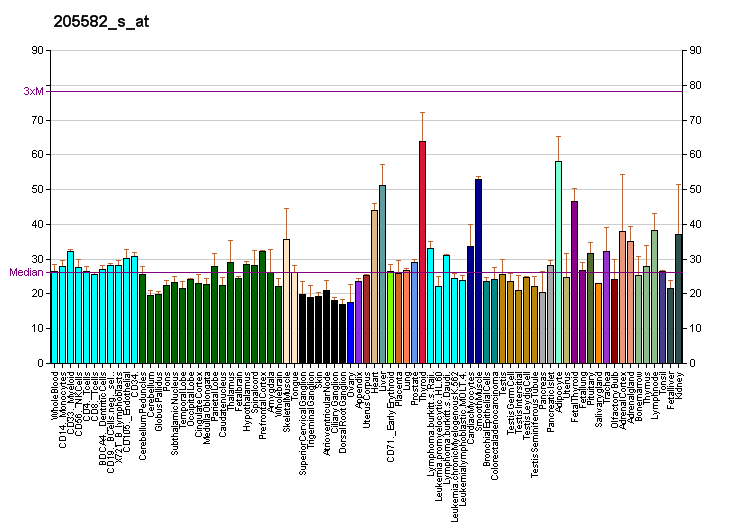
RNA expression pattern
| Bgee | Human / Mouse (ortholog); Top expressed in: right lobe of thyroid gland; right coronary artery; left lobe of thyroid gland; left coronary artery; left uterine tube; canal of the cervix; right auricle of heart; gastric mucosa; tibial nerve; subcutaneous adipose tissue / Top expressed in: granulocyte; stroma of bone marrow; gastrula; uterus; cervix; muscle of thigh; mammary gland; lactiferous gland; decidua; mesenteric lymph nodes; More reference expression data |
| BioGPS | More reference expression data |
Gene ontology
| Molecular function | transferase activity; peptidase activity; acyltransferase activity; hydrolase activity; leukotriene-C(4) hydrolase; glutathione hydrolase activity; hypoglycin A gamma-glutamyl transpeptidase activity; peptidyltransferase activity; leukotriene C4 gamma-glutamyl transferase activity |
| Cellular component | plasma membrane; membrane; integral component of membrane; intrinsic component of plasma membrane |
| Biological process | leukotriene metabolic process; glutathione biosynthetic process; inflammatory response; proteolysis; cellular amino acid metabolic process; glutathione metabolic process; glutathione catabolic process; leukotriene biosynthetic process; leukotriene D4 biosynthetic process; fatty acid metabolic process; protein biosynthesis; glutamate metabolic process; cysteine biosynthetic process |
Sources:Amigo / QuickGO
Orthologs
| Species | Human | Mouse |
| Entrez | 2687 | 23887 |
| Ensembl | ENSG00000099998 | ENSMUSG00000006344 |
| UniProt | P36269 | Q9Z2A9 |
| RefSeq (mRNA) | NM_001099781; NM_001099782; NM_001302464; NM_001302465; NM_004121 | NM_011820; NM_001359425 |
| RefSeq (protein) | NP_001093251; NP_001093252; NP_001289393; NP_001289394; NP_004112 | NP_035950; NP_001346354 |
| Location (UCSC) | Chr 22: 24.22 – 24.25 Mb | Chr 10: 75.43 – 75.45 Mb |
| PubMed search |
- Wikidata
| View/Edit Human | View/Edit Mouse |

Gamma-glutamyltransferase 5 is an enzyme that in humans is encoded by the GGT5 gene.

Gamma-glutamyltransferase-like activity 1 (GGTLA1) is a member of a gene family with at least 4 members (GGTLA1, GGTLA2, GGTLA3 and GGTLA4). The enzyme encoded by GGTLA1 is related to, but distinct from, gamma-glutamyl transpeptidase (GGT). The GGTLA1 enzyme consists of a heavy and a light chain and is able to hydrolyze the gamma-glutamyl moiety of glutathione. It converts leukotriene C4 to leukotriene D4, however, it doesn't convert synthetic substrates that are commonly used to assay GGT. Its amino acid sequence shows an overall similarity of 39.5% with human GGT.
