= Glutathionuria =

- Other names: Gamma-glutamyl transpeptidase deficiency
- Glutathione

Glutathionuria is the presence of glutathione in the urine, and is a rare inborn error of metabolism.

The condition has been identified in five patients.
