= Acid ceramidase =

Enzyme found in humans

ASAH1

Identifiers
- Aliases: ASAH1, AC, ACDase, ASAH, PHP, PHP32, SMAPME, N-acylsphingosine amidohydrolase (acid ceramidase) 1, N-acylsphingosine amidohydrolase 1
- External IDs: OMIM: 613468; MGI: 1277124; GeneCards: ASAH1
Enzyme activity
EC #	BRENDA	ExPASy	KEGG	MetaCyc
3.5.1.23	↗	↗	↗	↗
3.5.1.109	↗	↗	↗	↗

Gene location (Human)
Chr.	Chromosome 8 (human)
Band	8p22	Start	18,055,992 bp
Band	8p22	End	18,084,998 bp

Gene location (Mouse)
Chr.	Chromosome 8 (mouse)
Band	8|8 A4	Start	41,793,234 bp
Band	8|8 A4	End	41,827,810 bp
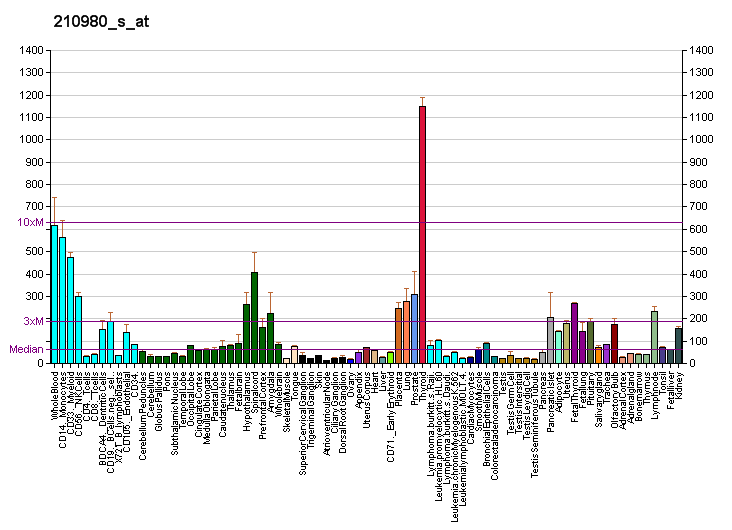

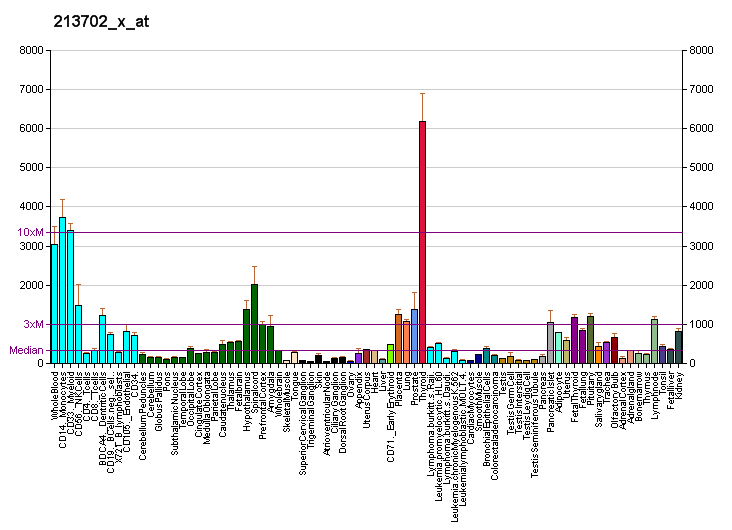
RNA expression pattern
Bgee	Human / Mouse (ortholog); Top expressed in: right ventricle; visceral pleura; pancreatic ductal cell; retinal pigment epithelium; myocardium; parietal pleura; nasal epithelium; monocyte; renal medulla; left ventricle / Top expressed in: saccule; stroma of bone marrow; endothelial cell of lymphatic vessel; otic placode; iris; calvaria; ciliary body; parotid gland; Epithelium of choroid plexus; epithelium of stomach; More reference expression data
BioGPS	More reference expression data
Gene ontology
Molecular function	N-acylsphingosine amidohydrolase activity; catalytic activity; hydrolase activity; hydrolase activity, acting on carbon-nitrogen (but not peptide) bonds; ceramidase activity; hydrolase activity, acting on carbon-nitrogen (but not peptide) bonds, in linear amides
Cellular component	lysosome; lysosomal lumen; extracellular exosome; extracellular region; extracellular space; tertiary granule lumen; ficolin-1-rich granule lumen; early endosome; endoplasmic reticulum; nucleus; cytoplasm
Biological process	glycosphingolipid metabolic process; ceramide metabolic process; lipid metabolism; neutrophil degranulation; sphingosine biosynthetic process; ceramide biosynthetic process; ceramide catabolic process; keratinocyte differentiation; regulation of steroid biosynthetic process; regulation of programmed necrotic cell death; cellular response to tumor necrosis factor; sphingolipid metabolic process
Sources:Amigo / QuickGO
Orthologs
Databases	NCBI: entry; OMA: entry
Species	Human	Mouse
Entrez	427	11886
Ensembl	ENSG00000104763	ENSMUSG00000031591
UniProt	Q13510	Q9WV54
RefSeq (mRNA)	NM_001127505; NM_004315; NM_177924; NM_001363743	NM_019734
RefSeq (protein)	NP_001120977; NP_004306; NP_808592; NP_001350672	NP_062708
Location (UCSC)	Chr 8: 18.06 – 18.08 Mb	Chr 8: 41.79 – 41.83 Mb
PubMed search
- Wikidata
View/Edit Human	View/Edit Mouse

Acid ceramidase is an enzyme that in humans is encoded by the ASAH1 gene.

== Function ==
This enzyme is a heterodimeric protein consisting of a nonglycosylated alpha subunit and a glycosylated beta subunit. The ASAH1 encoded precursor is posttranslationally cleaved into the two subunits, producing the mature enzyme. Acid ceramide catalyzes the synthesis and degradation of ceramide into sphingosine and fatty acid. Mutations in this gene have been associated with a lysosomal storage disorder known as Farber disease and, recently, with a rare neurodegenerative condition known as spinal muscular atrophy with progressive myoclonic epilepsy. Two transcript variants encoding distinct isoforms have been identified for this gene. In melanocytic cells ASAH1 gene expression may be regulated by MITF.

== As a glioblastoma drug target ==
ASAH1 expression is upregulated following radiation, suggesting it plays a role in conferring radioresistance to glioblastoma and in the development of recurrent glioblastoma. Inhibiting the activity of ASAH1 with carmofur, a drug that has been approved for clinical treatment of colorectal cancers in several countries, leads to substantial cell deaths and as a result has been proposed as a drug target in the treatment of glioblastoma. It has also been suggested to be a novel drug target against pediatric brain tumors as well.
