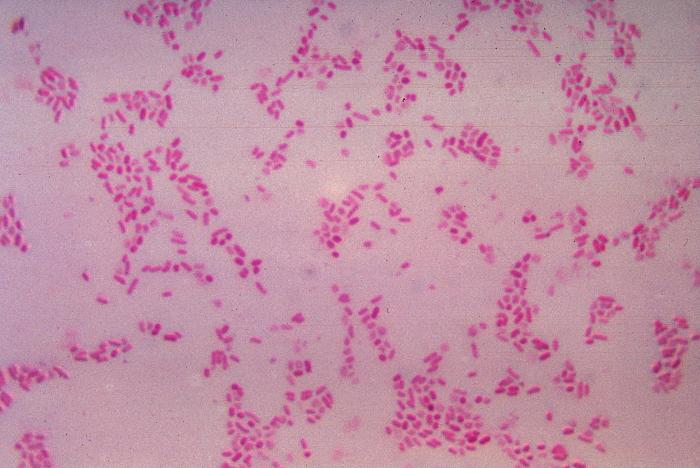

Scientific classification
- Domain: Bacteria
- Kingdom: Pseudomonadati
- Phylum: Bacteroidota
- Class: Bacteroidia
- Order: Bacteroidales
- Family: Bacteroidaceae
- Genus: Bacteroides
- Species: B. fragilis

Binomial name
- Bacteroides fragilis (Veillon and Zuber 1898) Castellani and Chalmers 1919 (Approved Lists 1980)

= Bacteroides fragilis =

Species of bacterium

Bacteroides fragilis is an anaerobic, Gram-negative, pleomorphic to rod-shaped bacterium. It is part of the normal microbiota of the human colon and is generally commensal, but can cause infection if displaced into the bloodstream or surrounding tissue following surgery, disease, or trauma.

== Habitat ==
Bacteroides fragilis resides in the human gastrointestinal tract and is essential to healthy gastrointestinal function such as mucosal immunity and host nutrition. As a mesophile, optimal growth occurs at 37 °C and a pH around 7.

== Morphology ==
Cells of B. fragilis are rod-shaped to pleomorphic with a cell size range of 0.5–1.5 × 1.0–6.0 μm.B. fragilis is a Gram-negative bacterium and does not possess flagella or cilia, making it immotile. However, it does utilize peritrichous fimbriae for adhesion to other molecular structures. B. fragilis also utilizes a complex series of surface proteins, lipopolysaccharide chains, and outer membrane vesicles to help survive the volatile intestinal micro-environment.

== Metabolism and mutualism in the gut microbiome ==
B. fragilis is an aerotolerant, anaerobic chemoorganotroph capable of fermenting a wide variety of glycans available in the human gut microenvironment including glucose, sucrose, and fructose. B. fragilis can also catabolize a variety of biopolymers, polysaccharides, and glycoproteins into smaller molecules which can then be used and further broken down by other microbes. Fatty acids produced by the fermentation of carbohydrates can serve as a source of energy for the host. Cytochrome bd oxidase is essential for oxygen consumption in B. fragilis and can allow other obligate anaerobes to survive in the now oxygen-reduced microenvironment. Animals lacking gut bacteria require 30% more caloric intake to maintain body mass.

== Environment-sensing systems ==
The complex environmental-sensory system allows B. fragilis to survive and adapt in the ever-changing human gut microbiome. This system is composed of many components and can effectively handle a variety of threats to the bacteria.

=== Bacteriocins ===
B. fragilis intestinal isolates secrete high levels of bacteriocin proteins and are resistant to other bacteriocins secreted by other closely related isolates. This mechanism is believed to reduce the level of intra-specific competition.

=== Bile salt resistance ===
B. fragilis utilizes enzymes such as bile salt hydrolase to resist the degrading effects of bile salts. Detergent activity of bile salts can permeabilize bacterial membranes which can eventually lead to membrane collapse and/or cell damage.

=== Oxidative stress response ===
Proteins such as catalase, superoxide dismutase, and alkyl hydroperoxide reductase protect the organism from harmful oxygen radicals. This permits growth in the presence of nanomolar concentrations of O_{2}.

== Antibiotic resistance ==
Member of the genus Bacteroides are characterized with having the highest numbers of antibiotic resistance mechanisms accompanied by the highest resistance rates amongst anaerobic bacteria. The high resistance to antibiotics of B.fragilis is mainly attributed to genetic plasticity. Species of the Bacteroidaceae have displayed increasing resistance to antimicrobial agents such as cefoxitin, clindamycin, metronidazole, carbapenems, and fluoroquinolones.

Bacteroides fragilis carries the cfiA gene encoding the metallo-β-lactamase (MBL), a carbapenemase that hydrolyzes beta-lactam antibiotics including carbapenems, thereby inactivating their function. Furthermore, upregulation of the cfiA gene gives rise to resistance to carbapenems.

=== Resistance reservoirs ===
Bacteroides species accumulate a variety of antibiotic/antimicrobial resistance genes as they reside in the gastrointestinal tract. This allows the genetic transfer of these genes to other Bacteroides species and possibly other more virulent bacteria leading to an overall increase in multi-drug resistance. This is exacerbated by the tendency of resistance genes to be relatively stable even without the presence of the antibiotic.

== Epidemiology and pathogenesis ==
The B. fragilis group is the most commonly isolated Bacteroidaceae in anaerobic infections, especially those that originate from the gastrointestinal microbiota. B. fragilis is the most prevalent organism in the B. fragilis group, accounting for 41% to 78% of the isolates of the group. These organisms are resistant to penicillin by virtue of production of beta-lactamase, and by other unknown factors.

This group was formerly classified as subspecies of B. fragilis (i.e. B. f. ssp. fragilis, B. f. ssp. distasonis, B. f. ssp. ovatus, B. f. ssp. thetaiotaomicron, and B. f. ssp. vulgatus). They have been reclassified into distinct species on the basis of DNA homology studies. B. fragilis (formerly known as B. f. ssp. fragilis) is often recovered from blood, pleural fluid, peritoneal fluid, wounds, and brain abscesses.

Although the B. fragilis group is the most common species found in clinical specimens, it is the least common Bacteroides present in fecal microbiota, comprising only 0.5% of the bacteria present in stool. Their pathogenicity partly results from their ability to produce capsular polysaccharide, which is protective against phagocytosis and stimulates abscess formation.

Bacteroides fragilis is involved in 90% of anaerobic peritoneal infections. It also causes bacteremia associated with intra-abdominal infections, peritonitis and abscesses following rupture of viscus, and subcutaneous abscesses or burns near the anus. Though it is gram negative, it has an altered LPS and does not cause endotoxic shock. Untreated B. fragilis infections have a 60% mortality rate.

Enterotoxigenic B. fragilis is a significant source of chronic inflammation in the context of gastrointestinal disease and has been implicated as a risk factor for colorectal cancer. The inflammation caused by B. fragilis induces spermine oxidase, a polyamine catabolic enzyme, that may result in production of increased reactive oxygen species and DNA damage leading to colon tumorigenesis.

== Anti-inflammatory effects ==
B. fragilis polysaccharide A (PSA) has been shown to protect animals from experimental diseases like colitis, asthma, or pulmonary inflammation. B. fragilis mutants lacking surface polysaccharides cannot easily colonize the intestine. PSA colonization of B. fragilis in the gut mucosa induces regulatory T cells and suppresses pro-inflammatory T helper 17 cells.

== See also ==
- List of oncogenic bacteria
- Infectious causes of cancer
- Pathogenic bacteria
