= Polysaccharide A =

Polysaccharide

Polysaccharide A (PSA) is a polysaccharide produced by the Gram-negative bacterium Bacteroides fragilis. B.fragilis produces eight identified distinct capsular polysaccharides, identified by the letters "A" through "H".

PSA interacts with Toll-like receptor 2 (TLR2) on dendritic cells. PSA colonization of B. fragilis in the gut mucosa induces regulatory T cells and suppresses pro-inflammatory T helper 17 cells. PSA has been shown to protect animals from experimental diseases like colitis, asthma, or pulmonary inflammation. Nonetheless, PSA can be pro-inflammatory as well as anti-inflammatory.

PSA has been studied extensively in the spleen and gastrointestinal tract, but PSA uses regulatory T cells to reduce inflammation in the central nervous system.
