= Bile salt hydrolase =

Microbial enzymes that deconjugate primary bile acids

Bile salt hydrolases (BSH) are microbial enzymes that deconjugate primary bile acids. They catalyze the first step of bile acid metabolism and maintain the bile acid pool for further modification by the microbiota. BSH enzymes play a role in a range of host and microbe functions including host physiology, immunity, and protection from pathogens.

== Structure ==
Bile salt hydrolases are members of the N-terminal nucleophilic hydrolase family, characterized by autocatalytic activation by an N-terminal nucleophile and subsequent amide bond cleavage. The majority of BSH enzymes are composed of homotetramers, although they have been known to assume other forms including homodimers and heterotrimers. All BSHs contain a catalytic Cys2 nucleophile residue, which is located at the N-terminus of the enzyme. While BSH structure may vary, other amino acids have been shown to be conserved across BSH-carrying bacteria. These include Arg18, Asp21, Asn82, and Arg228.

== Bile acid metabolism ==
=== Deconjugation ===
==== Substrate properties and specificity ====
In humans, primary bile acids are synthesized from cholesterol in the liver to form either cholic acid (CA) or chenodeoxycholic acid (CDCA). These primary bile acids are then conjugated to the amino acids glycine or taurine and stored in the gallbladder. During digestion, they are released and their detergent properties aid in the breakdown of dietary lipids. While the majority of primary bile acids are recirculated back to the liver via enterohepatic circulation, a small portion remain in the gastrointestinal tract, where they are modified by bacteria carrying BSH enzymes.

BSH specificity is thought to be determined by enzymatic structural differences and slight variations in amino acid composition. In general, more BSHs are thought to have a preference for glycine-conjugated bile acids, although the extent of their specificity may not yet be understood.

==== Mechanism ====
Deconjugation begins with the recognition of the substrate, which consists of a steroid core and a glyco- or tauro- amino acid. While the precise mechanism of recognition is unknown, it has been hypothesized that BSHs recognize the substrate by their conjugated amino acid. Upon recognition by the BSH, deconjugation begins with a nucleophilic attack by Cys2 on the amide bond of the target bile acid. Subsequently, a tetrahedral intermediate is formed and stabilized by Asn82 and Asn173 while Arg18 stabilizes a negatively-charged sulfhydryl on the N-terminus of Cys2. The negative charge on Cys2 is resolved by deacylation with water to finally produce a deconjugated primary bile acid.

=== Microbial conjugated bile acids ===
BSHs have also been found to perform a novel function: reconjugation. Unlike deconjugation, bile acid reconjugation involves the addition of amino acids to an unconjugated bile acid. Additionally, microbial bile acid conjugation is not limited to glycine or taurine. Instead, most amino acids can be conjugated to an unconjugated backbone. Microbial conjugation of bile acids has been hypothesized to either increase or decrease the antimicrobial properties of certain bile acids and their abundance may be altered in certain gastrointestinal diseases, although their exact roles in the gut have not been fully elucidated.

== Effects on human physiology and immunity ==
=== Physiology ===
One consequence of bile acid metabolism is the variety of effects on the host. In the case of BSHs, deconjugated bile acids can interact with host cellular receptors, thus altering aspects of host physiology. A key human cellular receptor is the farnesoid X receptor (FXR), a bile acid-activated transcription factor, which regulates bile acid synthesis and transport. Upon activation, FXR can repress bile acid synthesis and alter the bile acid pool. Bacteria that possess a BSH are associated with lower human cholesterol levels because the secondary bile acids they produce act as FXR agonists and promote cholesterol excretion. BSHs also have an effect on host glucose metabolism, energy, and lipid absorption. Through TGR-5, BSHs can regulate host glucose metabolism and have been shown to beneficially regulate insulin levels in diabetics.

=== Immunity ===
Bile acid metabolism, and by association BSHs, influences the immune system by shaping the gut microbiota and bile acid pool. BSHs shape the microbiota by altering the bile acid pool and creating substrates for further modification by other gut bacteria. Because they act as gatekeepers for further bile acid modification, BSHs play an important role in the production of deconjugated bile acids that can be modified into secondary bile acids. Secondary bile acids can influence innate immunity through their interactions with the bile acid receptors mentioned above, FXR and TGR-5. FXR and TGR-5 are expressed by intestinal immune cells such as macrophages, as well as NKT cells and dendritic cells. FXR has been shown to play a role with TLR-9 in inhibiting inflammation. TGR-5 interactions with the secondary bile acids DCA and LCA can prevent inflammation, and loss of this bile acid receptor is associated with an inflamed state in the gut.

In autoimmune disorders such as type 1 diabetes, the microbiome is perturbed. Due to this imbalance, a diseased state of the gut is associated with changes to the bile acid pool and different BSH phylotypes. Specifically, BSHs with high activity are associated with diseases while intermediate activity BSHs are associated with healthy individuals.

== Effects on the gut microbiota ==
BSHs are critical for secondary bile acid transformations, which are performed by different members of the gut microbiota. The composition of the gut microbiome is shaped in part by the deconjugated primary bile acids made available by BSHs. The modification of the primary bile acid end-product of BSHs to secondary bile acids produces several potent antimicrobials, which can protect the gut microbiota from pathogens. Secondary bile acids act as detergents and disrupt the microbial membrane, with some bile acids targeting specific types of bacteria such as Gram positives. Indirectly, bile acids shape the gut microbiota by regulating the innate immune system or activating cellular signaling machinery that excludes certain bacteria from the gut.

== Diversity ==
BSHs are commonly found in a variety of genera such as Lactobacillus, Enterococcus, and Bacteroides. Recent advances relating to the Human Microbiome Project have allowed for the identification of variants in BSHs found in the human gut. There are currently eight known phylotypes of BSH, with certain phylotypes being found in a single bacterial genus. The BSHs found in different genera of bacteria may have different substrate specificity, which can be an important influence on the bile acid pool and gut microbiota.

== Probiotics ==
As both probiotics and live biotherapeutics become more advanced, strain selection is becoming more essential for good product design. BSHs are often found in candidate probiotic organisms due to their myriad effects on both human health and the gut microbiota. Bifidobacteria and Lactobacilli are two popular probiotic organisms, both of which carry a BSH. BSHs play roles in reducing cholesterol levels and detoxifying bile acids that may damage the gut in high concentrations. Current issues with use of BSH-containing bacteria in probiotics include bioavailability and further modification of deconjugated bile acids to potentially toxic secondary bile acids.
