= Acyl-homoserine-lactone acylase =

Class of enzymes

Identifiers
- EC no.: 3.5.1.97

Databases
- IntEnz: IntEnz view
- BRENDA: BRENDA entry
- ExPASy: NiceZyme view
- KEGG: KEGG entry
- MetaCyc: metabolic pathway
- PRIAM: profile
- PDB structures: RCSB PDB PDBe PDBsum
Search
- PMC: articles
- PubMed: articles
- NCBI: proteins

Acyl-homoserine-lactone acylase (EC 3.5.1.97, acyl-homoserine lactone acylase, AHL-acylase, AiiD, N-acyl-homoserine lactone acylase, PA2385 protein, quorum-quenching AHL acylase, quorum-quenching enzyme, PvdQ, QuiP) is an enzyme with systematic name N-acyl-L-homoserine-lactone amidohydrolase. This enzyme functions as a quorum quencher by catalysing the following chemical reaction

an N-acyl-L-homoserine lactone + H_{2}O $\rightleftharpoons$ L-homoserine lactone + a carboxylate

Acyl homoserine lactones (AHLs) are produced by a number of bacterial species.
