= N-acetylglucosaminyltransferase I =

N-acetylglucosaminyltransferase I may refer to the following:

- A-1,3-mannosyl-glycoprotein 2-b-N-acetylglucosaminyltransferase, an enzyme
- Protein N-acetylglucosaminyltransferase, an enzyme
