= O-GlcNAc =

Post-translational carbohydrate modification of proteins

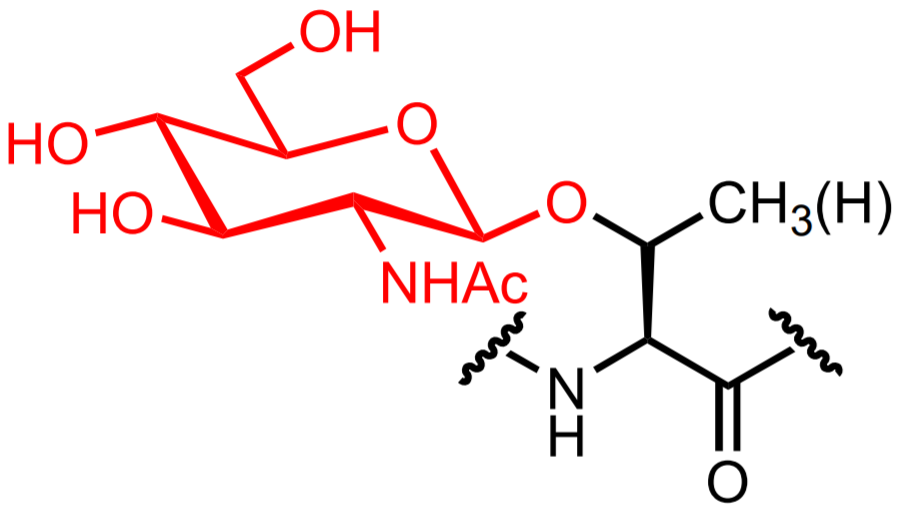
O-GlcNAc is a post-translational modification found on serine and threonine residues defined by a β-glycosidic bond between the side-chain hydroxyl and N-acetylglucosamine. GlcNAc moiety shown in red.

O-GlcNAc (short for O-linked GlcNAc or O-linked β-N-acetylglucosamine) is a reversible enzymatic post-translational modification that is found on serine and threonine residues of nucleocytoplasmic proteins. The modification is characterized by a β-glycosidic bond between the hydroxyl group of serine or threonine side chains and N-acetylglucosamine (GlcNAc). O-GlcNAc differs from other forms of protein glycosylation: (i) O-GlcNAc is not elongated or modified to form more complex glycan structures, (ii) O-GlcNAc is almost exclusively found on nuclear and cytoplasmic proteins rather than membrane proteins and secretory proteins, and (iii) O-GlcNAc is a highly dynamic modification that turns over more rapidly than the proteins which it modifies. O-GlcNAc is conserved across metazoans.

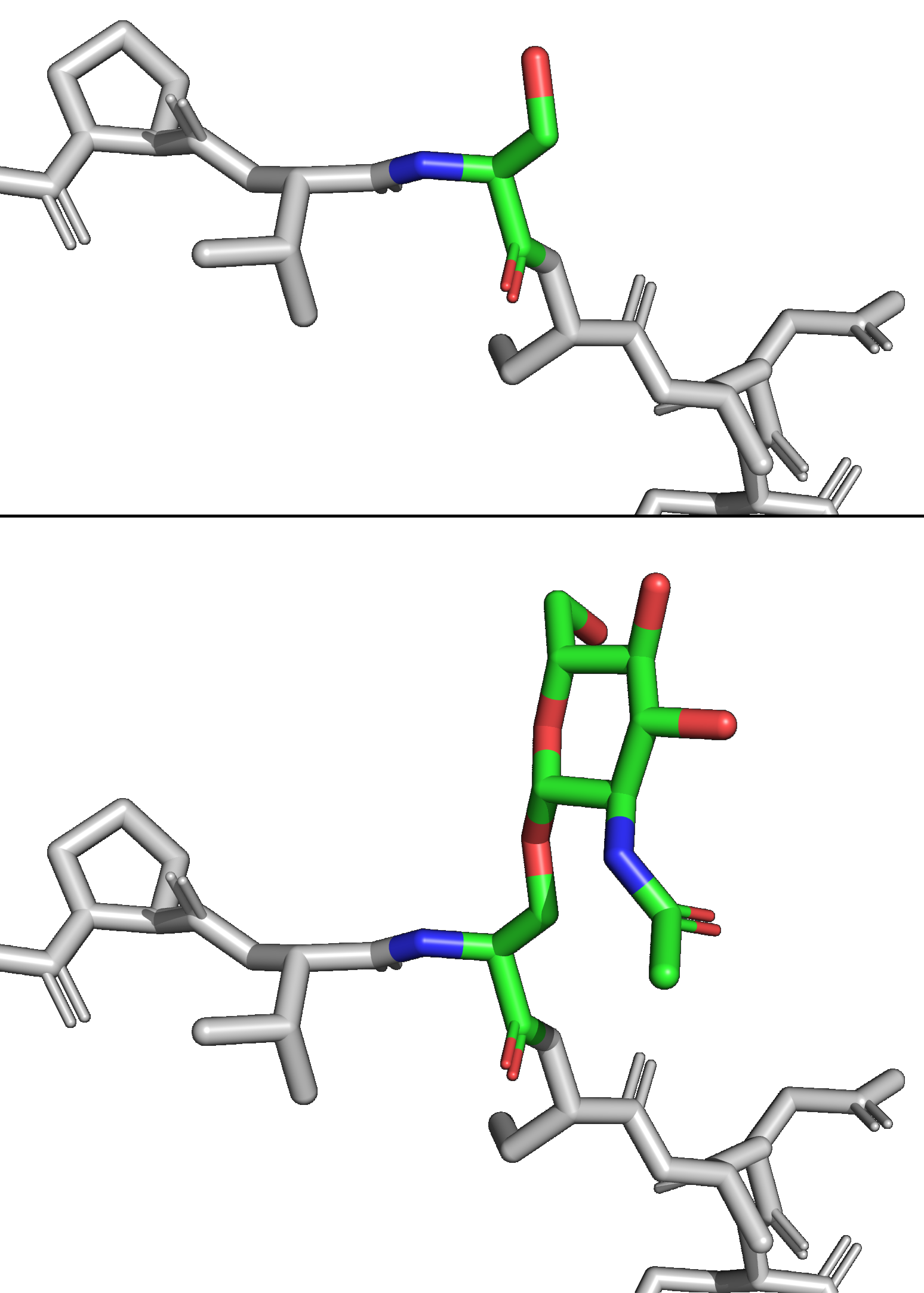
Serine in a polypeptide with no modifications (top) and with an O-GlcNAc modification (bottom). (PDB: 4GYW)

Due to the dynamic nature of O-GlcNAc and its presence on serine and threonine residues, O-GlcNAcylation is similar to protein phosphorylation in some respects and the two modifications seem to share an alternating relationship in many instances. While there are roughly 500 kinases and 150 phosphatases that regulate protein phosphorylation in humans, there are only 2 enzymes that regulate the cycling of O-GlcNAc: O-GlcNAc transferase (OGT) and O-GlcNAcase (OGA) catalyze the addition and removal of O-GlcNAc, respectively. OGT utilizes the sugar nucleotide UDP-GlcNAc as the glycosyl donor for transfer.

First reported in 1984, this post-translational modification has since been identified on over 9,000 proteins in H. sapiens. Numerous functional roles for O-GlcNAcylation have been reported including crosstalking with serine/threonine phosphorylation, regulating protein-protein interactions, altering protein structure or enzyme activity, changing protein subcellular localization, and modulating protein stability and degradation. Numerous components of the cell's transcription machinery have been identified as being modified by O-GlcNAc, and many studies have reported links between O-GlcNAc, transcription, and epigenetics. Many other cellular processes are influenced by O-GlcNAc such as apoptosis, the cell cycle, and stress responses. As UDP-GlcNAc is the final product of the hexosamine biosynthetic pathway, which integrates amino acid, carbohydrate, fatty acid, and nucleotide metabolism, it has been suggested that O-GlcNAc acts as a "nutrient sensor" and responds to the cell's metabolic status. Dysregulation of O-GlcNAc has been implicated in many pathologies including Alzheimer's disease, cancer, diabetes, and neurodegenerative disorders.

== Discovery ==
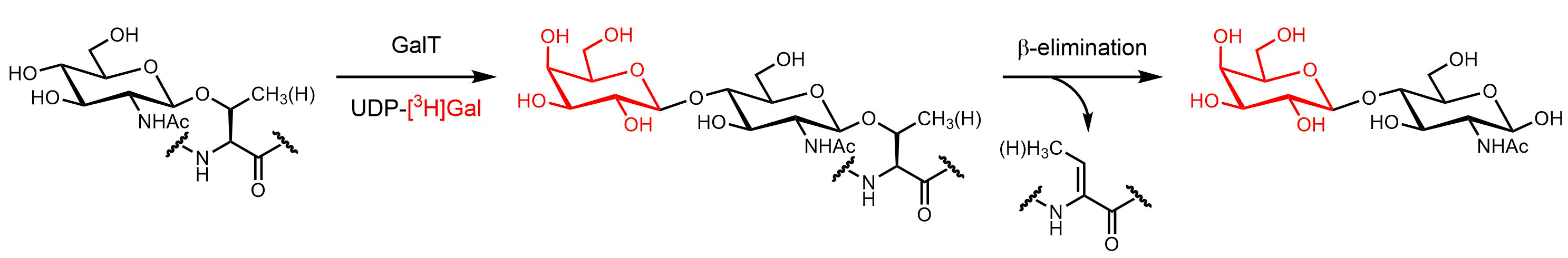
GalT radiolabeling of cellular proteins with UDP-[^{3}H]galactose followed by β-elimination yielded Galβ1-4GlcNAcitol, suggesting that the substrate for GalT was O-GlcNAc. Radiolabeled [^{3}H]galactose shown in red.

Gerald W. Hart, a founding figure of the field of glycobiology, discovered and performed much of the pioneering work on intracellular O-GlcNAcylation beginning in the 1980s at Johns Hopkins School of Medicine. Hart and colleagues were probing for terminal GlcNAc residues on the surfaces of thymocytes and lymphocytes. Bovine milk β-1,4-galactosyltransferase, which reacts with terminal GlcNAc residues, was used to perform radiolabeling with UDP-[^{3}H]galactose. Loss of signal from the labeled galactose following β-elimination of serine and threonine residues demonstrated that most of it was attached to proteins O-glycosidically; chromatography revealed that the major β-elimination product was Galβ1-4GlcNAcitol. Insensitivity to peptide N-glycosidase treatment provided additional evidence for O-linked GlcNAc. Permeabilizing cells with detergent prior to radiolabeling greatly increased the amount of [^{3}H]galactose incorporated into Galβ1-4GlcNAcitol, leading the authors to conclude that most of the O-linked GlcNAc monosaccharide residues were intracellular. This was in stark contrast to the prevailing understanding that protein glycosylation was nearly or entirely exclusive to the secretory pathway, as the topic was dominated by research of highly abundant extracellular mucin-type O-glycans.

== Mechanism ==
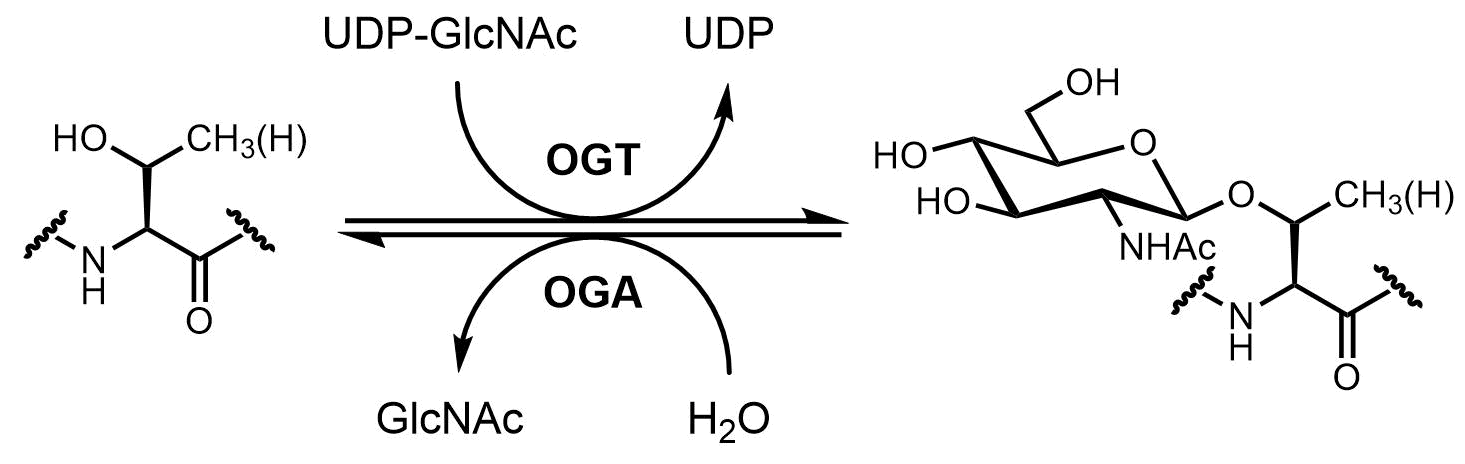
O-GlcNAcylation of serine and threonine residues is dynamically controlled by OGT and OGA.

O-GlcNAc is generally a dynamic modification that can be cycled on and off various proteins. Some residues are thought to be constitutively modified by O-GlcNAc. The O-GlcNAc modification is installed by OGT in a sequential bi-bi mechanism where the donor sugar, UDP-GlcNAc, binds to OGT first followed by the substrate protein. The O-GlcNAc modification is removed by OGA in a hydrolysis mechanism involving anchimeric assistance (substrate-assisted catalysis) to yield the unmodified protein and GlcNAc. While crystal structures have been reported for both OGT and OGA, the exact mechanisms by which OGT and OGA recognize substrates have not been completely elucidated. Unlike N-linked glycosylation, for which glycosylation occurs in a specific consensus sequence (Asn-X-Ser/Thr, where X is any amino acid except Pro), no definitive consensus sequence has been identified for O-GlcNAc. Consequently, predicting sites of O-GlcNAc modification is challenging, and identifying modification sites generally requires mass spectrometry methods. For OGT, studies have shown that substrate recognition is regulated by a number of factors including aspartate and asparagine ladder motifs in the lumen of the superhelical TPR domain, active site residues, and adaptor proteins. As crystal structures have shown that OGT requires its substrate to be in an extended conformation, it has been proposed that OGT has a preference for flexible substrates. In in vitro kinetic experiments measuring OGT and OGA activity on a panel of protein substrates, kinetic parameters for OGT were shown to be variable between various proteins while kinetic parameters for OGA were relatively constant between various proteins. This result suggested that OGT is the "senior partner" in regulating O-GlcNAc and OGA primarily recognizes substrates via the presence of O-GlcNAc rather than the identity of the modified protein.

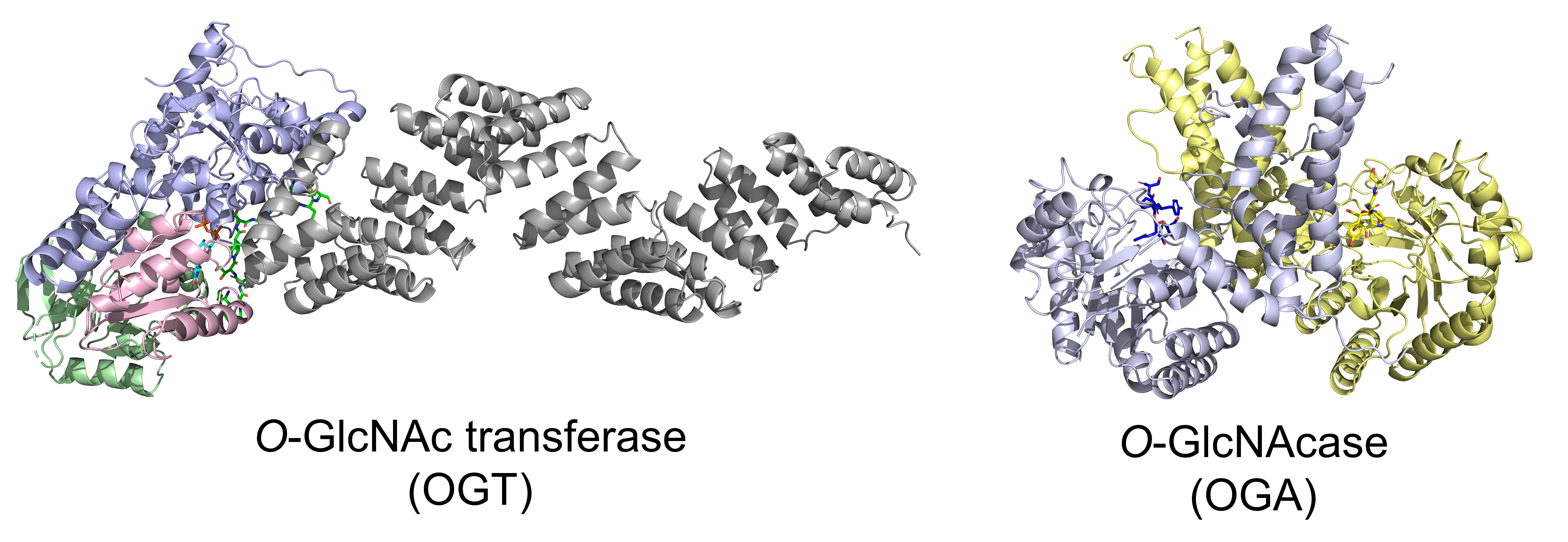
Left: Model of full-length ncOGT in complex with CKII peptide substrate and UDP. Colors indicate TPR domain (gray), N-terminal region of catalytic domain (light pink), intervening domain (light green), C-terminal region of catalytic domain (light blue), CKII peptide substrate (green), and UDP (cyan). Right: Structure of human OGA D175N dimer in complex with O-GlcNAcylated TAB1 peptide substrate. Monomers shown in blue-white/light yellow with respective peptide substrates in blue/yellow. (PDB: 5VVU)

== Detection and characterization ==
Several methods exist to detect the presence of O-GlcNAc and characterize the specific residues modified.

=== Lectins ===
Wheat germ agglutinin, a plant lectin, is able to recognize terminal GlcNAc residues and is thus often used for detection of O-GlcNAc. This lectin has been applied in lectin affinity chromatography for the enrichment and detection of O-GlcNAc.

=== Antibodies ===
Pan-O-GlcNAc antibodies that recognize the O-GlcNAc modification largely irrespective of the modified protein's identity are commonly used. These include RL2, an IgG antibody raised against O-GlcNAcylated nuclear pore complex proteins, and CTD110.6, an IgM antibody raised against an immunogenic peptide with a single serine O-GlcNAc modification. Other O-GlcNAc-specific antibodies have been reported and demonstrated to have some dependence on the identity of the modified protein.

=== Metabolic labeling ===
Many metabolic chemical reporters have been developed to identify O-GlcNAc. Metabolic chemical reporters are generally sugar analogues that bear an additional chemical moiety allowing for additional reactivity. For example, peracetylated GlcNAc (Ac_{4}GlcNAz) is a cell-permeable azido sugar that is de-esterified intracellularly by esterases to GlcNAz and converted to UDP-GlcNAz in the hexosamine salvage pathway. UDP-GlcNAz can be utilized as a sugar donor by OGT to yield the O-GlcNAz modification. The presence of the azido sugar can then be visualized via alkyne-containing bioorthogonal chemical probes in an azide-alkyne cycloaddition reaction. These probes can incorporate easily identifiable tags such as the FLAG peptide, biotin, and dye molecules. Mass tags based on polyethylene glycol (PEG) have also been used to measure O-GlcNAc stoichiometry. Conjugation of 5 kDa PEG molecules leads to a mass shift for modified proteins - more heavily O-GlcNAcylated proteins will have multiple PEG molecules and thus migrate more slowly in gel electrophoresis. Other metabolic chemical reporters bearing azides or alkynes (generally at the 2 or 6 positions) have been reported. Instead of GlcNAc analogues, GalNAc analogues may be used as well as UDP-GalNAc is in equilibrium with UDP-GlcNAc in cells due to the action of UDP-galactose-4'-epimerase (GALE). Ac_{4}GalNAz shows enhanced labeling of O-GlcNAc versus Ac_{4}GlcNAz, possibly due to a bottleneck in UDP-GlcNAc pyrophosphorylase processing of GlcNAz-1-P to UDP-GlcNAz. Ac_{3}GlcN-β-Ala-NBD-α-1-P(Ac-SATE)_{2}, a metabolic chemical reporter that is processed intracellularly to a fluorophore-labeled UDP-GlcNAc analogue, has been shown to achieve one-step fluorescent labeling of O-GlcNAc in live cells.

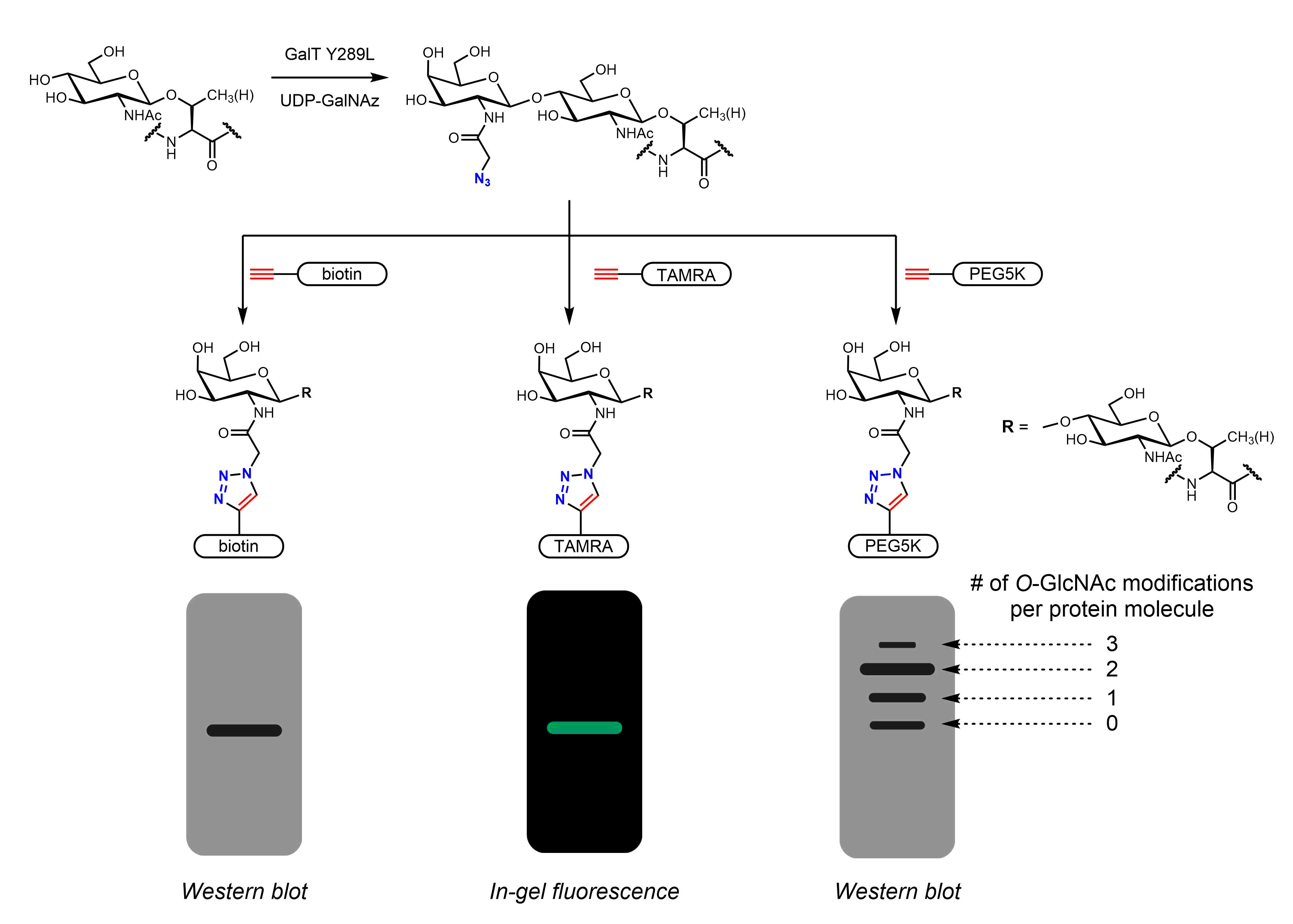
Chemoenzymatic labeling for the detection of O-GlcNAc. GalT Y289L transfers GalNAz to O-GlcNAc, providing a handle for click chemistry. Various probes can be conjugated via azide-alkyne cycloaddition. Attachment of a PEG5K mass tag allows for visualization of O-GlcNAc stoichiometry.

Metabolic labeling may also be used to identify binding partners of O-GlcNAcylated proteins. The N-acetyl group may be elongated to incorporate a diazirine moiety. Treatment of cells with peracetylated, phosphate-protected Ac_{3}GlcNDAz-1-P(Ac-SATE)_{2} leads to modification of proteins with O-GlcNDAz. UV irradiation then induces photocrosslinking between proteins bearing the O-GlcNDaz modification and interacting proteins.

Some issues have been identified with various metabolic chemical reporters, e.g., their use may inhibit the hexosamine biosynthetic pathway, they may not be recognized by OGA and therefore are not able to capture O-GlcNAc cycling, or they may be incorporated into glycosylation modifications besides O-GlcNAc as seen in secreted proteins. Metabolic chemical reporters with chemical handles at the N-acetyl position may also label acetylated proteins as the acetyl group may be hydrolyzed into acetate analogues that can be utilized for protein acetylation. Additionally, per-O-acetylated monosaccharides have been identified to react with cysteines leading to artificial S-glycosylation via an elimination-addition mechanism. Next-generation metabolic chemical reporters have been developed to overcome this off-target reactivity.

=== Chemoenzymatic labeling ===
Chemoenzymatic labeling provides an alternative strategy to incorporate handles for click chemistry. The Click-IT O-GlcNAc Enzymatic Labeling System, developed by the Hsieh-Wilson group and subsequently commercialized by Invitrogen, utilizes a mutant GalT Y289L enzyme that is able to transfer azidogalactose (GalNAz) onto O-GlcNAc. The presence of GalNAz (and therefore also O-GlcNAc) can be detected with various alkyne-containing probes with identifiable tags such as biotin, dye molecules, and PEG.

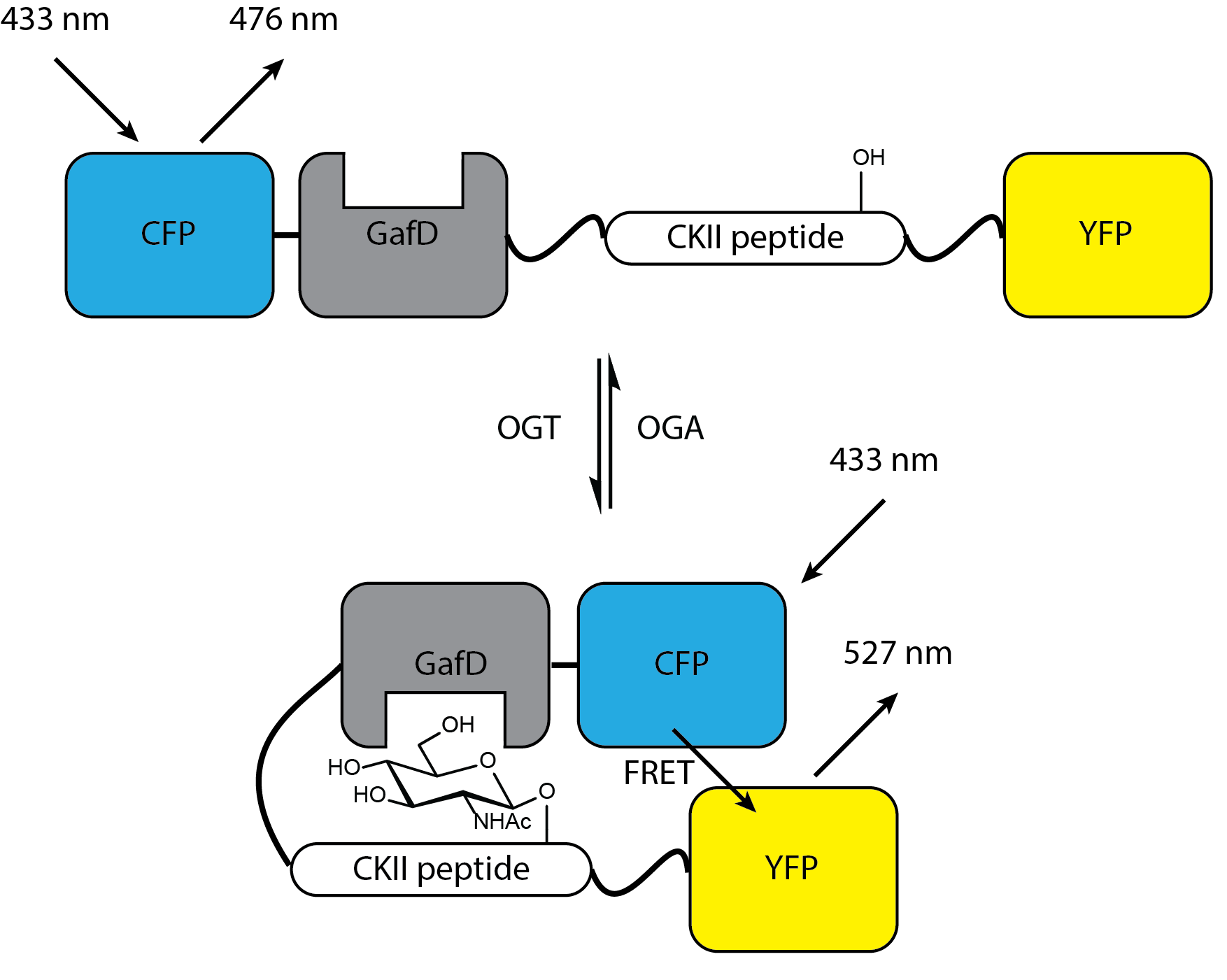
FRET biosensor for O-GlcNAc. Under high O-GlcNAc conditions, GafD will bind the O-GlcNAc group on the CKII peptide substrate, bringing CFP and YFP into proximity for FRET. Various localization sequences can be fused to localize the sensor to various cellular compartments, e.g., nucleus, cytoplasm, and plasma membrane.

=== Förster resonance energy transfer biosensor ===
An engineered protein biosensor has been developed that can detect changes in O-GlcNAc levels using Förster resonance energy transfer. This sensor consists of four components linked together in the following order: cyan fluorescent protein (CFP), an O-GlcNAc binding domain (based on GafD, a lectin sensitive for terminal β-O-GlcNAc), a CKII peptide that is a known OGT substrate, and yellow fluorescent protein (YFP). Upon O-GlcNAcylation of the CKII peptide, the GafD domain binds the O-GlcNAc moiety, bringing the CFP and YFP domains into close proximity and generating a FRET signal. Generation of this signal is reversible and can be used to monitor O-GlcNAc dynamics in response to various treatments. This sensor may be genetically encoded and used in cells. Addition of a localization sequence allows for targeting of this O-GlcNAc sensor to the nucleus, cytoplasm, or plasma membrane.

=== Mass spectrometry ===
Biochemical approaches such as Western blotting may provide supporting evidence that a protein is modified by O-GlcNAc; mass spectrometry (MS) is able to provide definitive evidence as to the presence of O-GlcNAc. Glycoproteomic studies applying MS have contributed to the identification of proteins modified by O-GlcNAc.

As O-GlcNAc is substoichiometric and ion suppression occurs in the presence of unmodified peptides, an enrichment step is usually performed prior to mass spectrometry analysis. This may be accomplished using lectins, antibodies, or chemical tagging. The O-GlcNAc modification is labile under collision-induced fragmentation methods such as collision-induced dissociation (CID) and higher-energy collisional dissociation (HCD), so these methods in isolation are not readily applicable for O-GlcNAc site mapping. HCD generates fragment ions characteristic of N-acetylhexosamines that can be used to determine O-GlcNAcylation status. In order to facilitate site mapping with HCD, β-elimination followed by Michael addition with dithiothreitol (BEMAD) may be used to convert the labile O-GlcNAc modification into a more stable mass tag. For BEMAD mapping of O-GlcNAc, the sample must be treated with phosphatatase otherwise other serine/threonine post-translational modifications such as phosphorylation may be detected. Electron-transfer dissociation (ETD) is used for site mapping as ETD causes peptide backbone cleavage while leaving post-translational modifications such as O-GlcNAc intact.

Traditional proteomic studies perform tandem MS on the most abundant species in the full-scan mass spectra, prohibiting full characterization of lower-abundance species. One modern strategy for targeted proteomics uses isotopic labels, e.g., dibromide, to tag O-GlcNAcylated proteins. This method allows for algorithmic detection of low-abundance species, which are then sequenced by tandem MS. Directed tandem MS and targeted glycopeptide assignment allow for identification of O-GlcNAcylated peptide sequences. One example probe consists of a biotin affinity tag, an acid-cleavable silane, an isotopic recoding motif, and an alkyne. Unambiguous site mapping is possible for peptides with only one serine/threonine residue.

The general procedure for this isotope-targeted glycoproteomics (IsoTaG) method is the following:

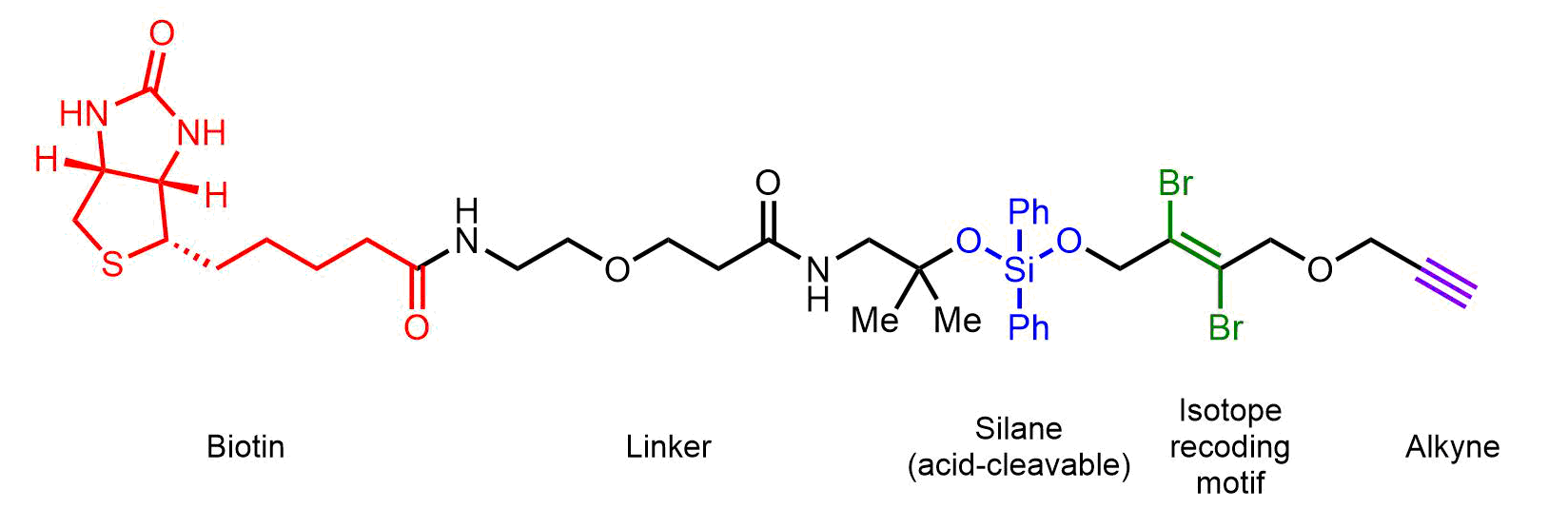
Structure of IsoTaG probe. Probe consists of a biotin affinity tag (red), a linker (black), an acid-cleavable silane (blue), an isotope recoding motif (green), and an alkyne (purple).

1. Metabolically label O-GlcNAc to install O-GlcNAz onto proteins
2. Use click chemistry to link IsoTaG probe to O-GlcNAz
3. Use streptavidin beads to enrich for tagged proteins
4. Treat beads with trypsin to release non-modified peptides
5. Cleave isotopically recoded glycopeptides from beads using mild acid
6. Obtain a full-scan mass spectrum from isotopically recoded glycopeptides
7. Apply algorithm to detect unique isotope signature from probe
8. Perform tandem MS on the isotopically recoded species to obtain glycopeptide amino acid sequences
9. Search protein database for identified sequences

Other methodologies have been developed for quantitative profiling of O-GlcNAc using differential isotopic labeling. Example probes generally consist of a biotin affinity tag, a cleavable linker (acid- or photo-cleavable), a heavy or light isotopic tag, and an alkyne.

O-GlcNAc modification has also been recently reported on tyrosine residues, though these represent roughly 5% of all O-GlcNAc modifications.

== Strategies for manipulating O-GlcNAc ==
Various chemical and genetic strategies have been developed to manipulate O-GlcNAc, both on a proteome-wide basis and on specific proteins.

=== Chemical methods ===
Small molecule inhibitors have been reported for both OGT and OGA that function in cells or in vivo. OGT inhibitors result in a global decrease of O-GlcNAc while OGA inhibitors result in a global increase of O-GlcNAc; these inhibitors are not able to modulate O-GlcNAc on specific proteins.

Inhibition of the hexosamine biosynthetic pathway is also able to decrease O-GlcNAc levels. For instance, glutamine analogues azaserine and 6-diazo-5-oxo-L-norleucine (DON) can inhibit GFAT, though these molecules may also non-specifically affect other pathways.

=== Protein synthesis ===
Expressed protein ligation has been used to prepare O-GlcNAc-modified proteins in a site-specific manner. Methods exist for solid-phase peptide synthesis incorporation of GlcNAc-modified serine, threonine, or cysteine.

=== Genetic methods ===
==== Site-directed mutagenesis ====
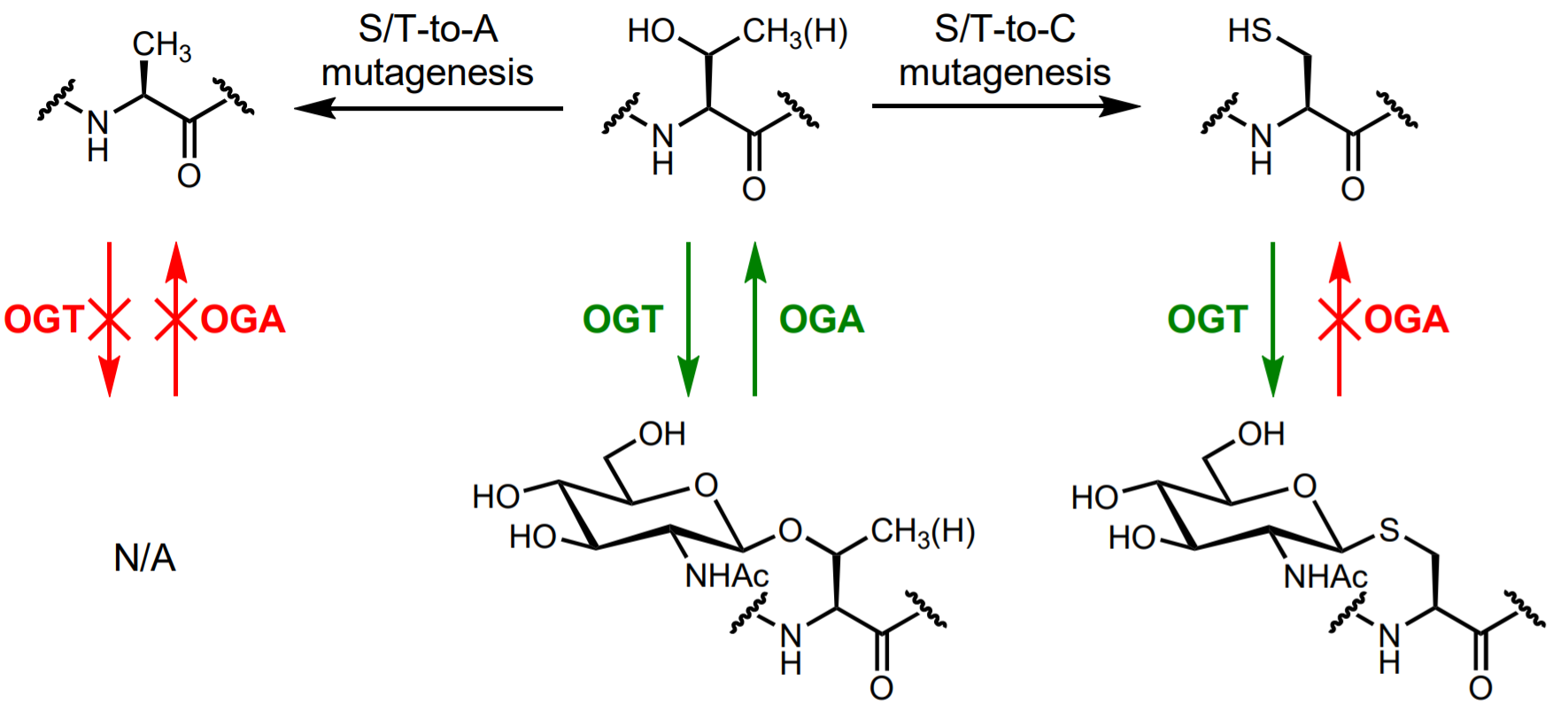
Site-directed mutagenesis for manipulating O-GlcNAc. S/T-to-A mutagenesis prevents O-GlcNAc modification at that residue. S/T-to-C mutagenesis allows for generation of the S-GlcNAc modification, a structural analogue of O-GlcNAc that is not readily hydrolyzed by OGA.

Site-directed mutagenesis of O-GlcNAc-modified serine or threonine residues to alanine may be used to evaluate the function of O-GlcNAc at specific residues. As alanine's side chain is a methyl group and is thus not able to act as an O-GlcNAc site, this mutation effectively permanently removes O-GlcNAc at a specific residue. While serine/threonine phosphorylation may be modeled by mutagenesis to aspartate or glutamate, which have negatively charged carboxylate side chains, none of the 20 canonical amino acids sufficiently recapitulate the properties of O-GlcNAc. Mutagenesis to tryptophan has been used to mimic the steric bulk of O-GlcNAc, though tryptophan is much more hydrophobic than O-GlcNAc. Mutagenesis may also perturb other post-translational modifications, e.g., if a serine is alternatively phosphorylated or O-GlcNAcylated, alanine mutagenesis permanently eliminates the possibilities of both phosphorylation and O-GlcNAcylation.

===== S-GlcNAc =====
Mass spectrometry identified S-GlcNAc as a post-translational modification found on cysteine residues. In vitro experiments demonstrated that OGT could catalyze the formation of S-GlcNAc and that OGA is incapable of hydrolyzing S-GlcNAc. Though a previous report suggested that OGA is capable of hydrolyzing thioglycosides, this was only demonstrated on the aryl thioglycoside para-nitrophenol-S-GlcNAc; para-nitrothiophenol is a more activated leaving group than a cysteine residue. Recent studies have supported the use of S-GlcNAc as an enzymatically stable structural model of O-GlcNAc that can be incorporated through solid-phase peptide synthesis or site-directed mutagenesis.

==== Engineered OGT ====
Fusion constructs of a nanobody and TPR-truncated OGT allow for proximity-induced protein-specific O-GlcNAcylation in cells. The nanobody may be directed towards protein tags, e.g., GFP, that are fused to the target protein, or the nanobody may be directed towards endogenous proteins. For example, a nanobody recognizing a C-terminal EPEA sequence can direct OGT enzymatic activity to α-synuclein.

== Functions of O-GlcNAc ==
=== Apoptosis ===
Apoptosis, a form of controlled cell death, has been suggested to be regulated by O-GlcNAc. In various cancers, elevated O-GlcNAc levels have been reported to suppress apoptosis. Caspase-3, caspase-8, and caspase-9 have been reported to be modified by O-GlcNAc. Caspase-8 is modified near its cleavage/activation sites; O-GlcNAc modification may block caspase-8 cleavage and activation by steric hindrance. Pharmacological lowering of O-GlcNAc with 5S-GlcNAc accelerated caspase activation while pharmacological raising of O-GlcNAc with thiamet-G inhibited caspase activation.

=== Epigenetics ===
==== Writers and Erasers ====
The proteins that regulate genetics are often categorized as writers, readers, and erasers, i.e., enzymes that install epigenetic modifications, proteins that recognize these modifications, and enzymes that remove these modifications. To date, O-GlcNAc has been identified on writer and eraser enzymes. O-GlcNAc is found in multiple locations on EZH2, the catalytic methyltransferase subunit of PRC2, and is thought to stabilize EZH2 prior to PRC2 complex formation and regulate di- and tri-methyltransferase activity. All three members of the ten-eleven translocation (TET) family of dioxygenases (TET1, TET2, and TET3) are known to be modified by O-GlcNAc. O-GlcNAc has been suggested to cause nuclear export of TET3, reducing its enzymatic activity by depleting it from the nucleus. O-GlcNAcylation of HDAC1 is associated with elevated activating phosphorylation of HDAC1.

==== Histone O-GlcNAcylation ====
Histone proteins, the primary protein component of chromatin, have been reported to be modified by O-GlcNAc, though other studies have not been able to detect histone O-GlcNAc. The presence of O-GlcNAc on histones has been suggested to affect gene transcription as well as other histone marks such as acetylation and monoubiquitination. TET2 has been reported to interact with the TPR domain of OGT and facilitate recruitment of OGT to histones. Phosphorylation of OGT T444 via AMPK has been found to inhibit OGT-chromatin association and downregulate H2B S112 O-GlcNAc.

=== Nutrient sensing ===
The hexosamine biosynthetic pathway's product, UDP-GlcNAc, is utilized by OGT to catalyze the addition of O-GlcNAc. This pathway integrates information about the concentrations of various metabolites including amino acids, carbohydrates, fatty acids, and nucleotides. Consequently, UDP-GlcNAc levels are sensitive to cellular metabolite levels. OGT activity is in part regulated by UDP-GlcNAc concentration, making a link between cellular nutrient status and O-GlcNAc.

Glucose deprivation causes a decline in UDP-GlcNAc levels and an initial decline in O-GlcNAc, but counterintuitively, O-GlcNAc is later significantly upregulated. This later increase has been shown to be dependent on AMPK and p38 MAPK activation, and this effect is partially due to increases in OGT mRNA and protein levels. It has also been suggested that this effect is dependent on calcium and CaMKII. Activated p38 is able to recruit OGT to specific protein targets, including neurofilament H; O-GlcNAc modification of neurofilament H enhances its solubility. During glucose deprivation, glycogen synthase is modified by O-GlcNAc which inhibits its activity.

=== Oxidative stress ===
NRF2, a transcription factor associated with the cellular response to oxidative stress, has been found to be indirectly regulated by O-GlcNAc. KEAP1, an adaptor protein for the cullin 3-dependent E3 ubiquitin ligase complex, mediates the degradation of NRF2; oxidative stress leads to conformational changes in KEAP1 that repress degradation of NRF2. O-GlcNAc modification of KEAP1 at S104 is required for efficient ubiquitination and subsequent degradation of NRF2, linking O-GlcNAc to oxidative stress. Glucose deprivation leads to a reduction in O-GlcNAc and reduces NRF2 degradation. Cells expressing a KEAP1 S104A mutant are resistant to erastin-induced ferroptosis, consistent with higher NRF2 levels upon removal of S104 O-GlcNAc.

Elevated O-GlcNAc levels have been associated with diminished synthesis of hepatic glutathione, an important cellular antioxidant. Acetaminophen overdose leads to accumulation of the strongly oxidizing metabolite NAPQI in the liver, which is detoxified by glutathione. In mice, OGT knockout has a protective effect against acetaminophen-induced liver injury, while OGA inhibition with thiamet-G exacerbates acetaminophen-induced liver injury.

=== Protein aggregation ===
O-GlcNAc has been found to slow protein aggregation, though the generality of this phenomenon is unknown.

Solid-phase peptide synthesis was used to prepare full-length α-synuclein with an O-GlcNAc modification at T72. Thioflavin T aggregation assays and transmission electron microscopy demonstrated that this modified α-synuclein does not readily form aggregates.

Treatment of JNPL3 tau transgenic mice with an OGA inhibitor was shown to increase microtubule-associated protein tau O-GlcNAcylation. Immunohistochemistry analysis of the brainstem revealed decreased formation of neurofibrillary tangles. Recombinant O-GlcNAcylated tau was shown to aggregate slower than unmodified tau in an in vitro thioflavin S aggregation assay. Similar results were obtained for a recombinantly prepared O-GlcNAcylated TAB1 construct versus its unmodified form.

=== Protein phosphorylation ===
==== Crosstalk ====
Many known phosphorylation sites and O-GlcNAcylation sites are nearby each other or overlapping. As protein O-GlcNAcylation and phosphorylation both occur on serine and threonine residues, these post-translational modifications can regulate each other. For example, in CKIIα, S347 O-GlcNAc has been shown to antagonize T344 phosphorylation. Reciprocal inhibition, i.e., phosphorylation inhibition of O-GlcNAcylation and O-GlcNAcylation of phosphorylation, has been observed on other proteins including murine estrogen receptor β, RNA Pol II, tau, p53, CaMKIV, p65, β-catenin, and α-synuclein. Positive cooperativity has also been observed between these two post-translational modifications, i.e., phosphorylation induces O-GlcNAcylation or O-GlcNAcylation induces phosphorylation. This has been demonstrated on MeCP2 and HDAC1. In other proteins, e.g., cofilin, phosphorylation and O-GlcNAcylation appear to occur independently of each other.

In some cases, therapeutic strategies are under investigation to modulate O-GlcNAcylation to have a downstream effect on phosphorylation. For instance, elevating tau O-GlcNAcylation may offer therapeutic benefit by inhibiting pathological tau hyperphosphorylation.

Besides phosphorylation, O-GlcNAc has been found to influence other post-translational modifications such as lysine acetylation and monoubiquitination.

==== Kinases ====
Protein kinases are the enzymes responsible for phosphorylation of serine and threonine residues. O-GlcNAc has been identified on over 100 (~20% of the human kinome) kinases, and this modification is often associated with alterations in kinase activity or kinase substrate scope. O-GlcNAc may have diverse functional consequences on kinases such as interfering with ATP binding, altering substrate recognition, or regulating other PTMs on kinases. Complex cross-talk relations can also exist where OGT and a kinase, e.g., AMPK, modify each other.

==== Phosphatases ====
Protein phosphatase 1 subunits PP1β and PP1γ have been shown to form functional complexes with OGT. A synthetic phosphopeptide was able to be dephosphorylated and O-GlcNAcylated by an OGT immunoprecipitate. This complex has been referred to as a "yin-yang complex" as it replaces a phosphate modification with an O-GlcNAc modification. PP1γ also exists in a heterotrimer with OGT and URI under high glucose conditions.

MYPT1 is another protein phosphatase subunit that forms complexes with OGT and is itself O-GlcNAcylated. MYPT1 appears to have a role in directing OGT towards specific substrates.

=== Protein-protein interactions ===
O-GlcNAcylation of a protein can alter its interactome. As O-GlcNAc is highly hydrophilic, its presence may disrupt hydrophobic protein-protein interactions. For example, O-GlcNAc disrupts Sp1 interaction with TAF_{II}110, and O-GlcNAc disrupts CREB interaction with TAF_{II}130 and CRTC.

Some studies have also identified instances where protein-protein interactions are induced by O-GlcNAc. Metabolic labeling with the diazirine-containing O-GlcNDAz has been applied to identify protein-protein interactions induced by O-GlcNAc. Using a bait glycopeptide based roughly on a consensus sequence for O-GlcNAc, α-enolase, EBP1, and 14-3-3 were identified as potential O-GlcNAc readers. X-ray crystallography showed that 14-3-3 recognized O-GlcNAc through an amphipathic groove that also binds phosphorylated ligands. Hsp70 has also been proposed to act as a lectin to recognize O-GlcNAc. It has been suggested that O-GlcNAc plays a role in the interaction of α-catenin and β-catenin.

=== Protein stability and degradation ===
Co-translational O-GlcNAc has been identified on Sp1 and Nup62. This modification suppresses co-translational ubiquitination and thus protects nascent polypeptides from proteasomal degradation. Similar protective effects of O-GlcNAc on full-length Sp1 have been observed. It is unknown if this pattern is universal or only applicable to specific proteins.

Protein phosphorylation is often used as a mark for subsequent degradation. Tumor suppressor protein p53 is targeted for proteasomal degradation via COP9 signalosome-mediated phosphorylation of T155. O-GlcNAcylation of p53 S149 has been associated with decreased T155 phosphorylation and protection of p53 from degradation. β-catenin O-GlcNAcylation competes with T41 phosphorylation, which signals β-catenin for degradation, stabilizing the protein.

O-GlcNAcylation of the Rpt2 ATPase subunit of the 26S proteasome has been shown to inhibit proteasome activity. Testing various peptide sequences revealed that this modification slows proteasomal degradation of hydrophobic peptides, degradation of hydrophilic peptides does not appear to be affected. This modification has been shown to suppress other pathways that activate the proteasome such as Rpt6 phosphorylation by cAMP-dependent protein kinase.

OGA-S localizes to lipid droplets and has been proposed to locally activate the proteasome to promote remodeling of lipid droplet surface proteins.

=== Stress response ===
Various cellular stress stimuli have been associated with changes in O-GlcNAc. Treatment with hydrogen peroxide, cobalt(II) chloride, UVB light, ethanol, sodium chloride, heat shock, and sodium arsenite, all result in elevated O-GlcNAc. Knockout of OGT sensitizes cells to thermal stress. Elevated O-GlcNAc has been associated with expression of Hsp40 and Hsp70.

== Therapeutic relevance ==
=== Neurodegeneration ===
Pathological protein aggregation is a major hallmark of multiple neurodegenerative diseases. O-GlcNAc on various proteins has been found to play roles in suppressing protein aggregation, motivating clinical efforts to inhibit OGA and elevate cellular O-GlcNAc levels. This strategy is being evaluated by companies for Alzheimer's disease, Parkinson's disease, progressive supranuclear palsy, and amyotrophic lateral sclerosis (ALS). Multiple companies have advanced OGA inhibitors into the clinic including Alectos Therapeutics, Asceneuron, Biogen, Eli Lilly, and Merck.

==== Alzheimer's disease ====
Numerous studies have identified aberrant phosphorylation of tau as a hallmark of Alzheimer's disease. O-GlcNAcylation of bovine tau was first characterized in 1996. A subsequent report in 2004 demonstrated that human brain tau is also modified by O-GlcNAc. O-GlcNAcylation of tau was demonstrated to regulate tau phosphorylation with hyperphosphorylation of tau observed in the brain of mice lacking OGT, which has been associated with the formation of neurofibrillary tangles. Analysis of brain samples showed that protein O-GlcNAcylation is compromised in Alzheimer's disease and paired helical fragment-tau was not recognized by traditional O-GlcNAc detection methods, suggesting that pathological tau has impaired O-GlcNAcylation relative to tau isolated from control brain samples. Elevating tau O-GlcNAcylation was proposed as a therapeutic strategy for reducing tau phosphorylation.

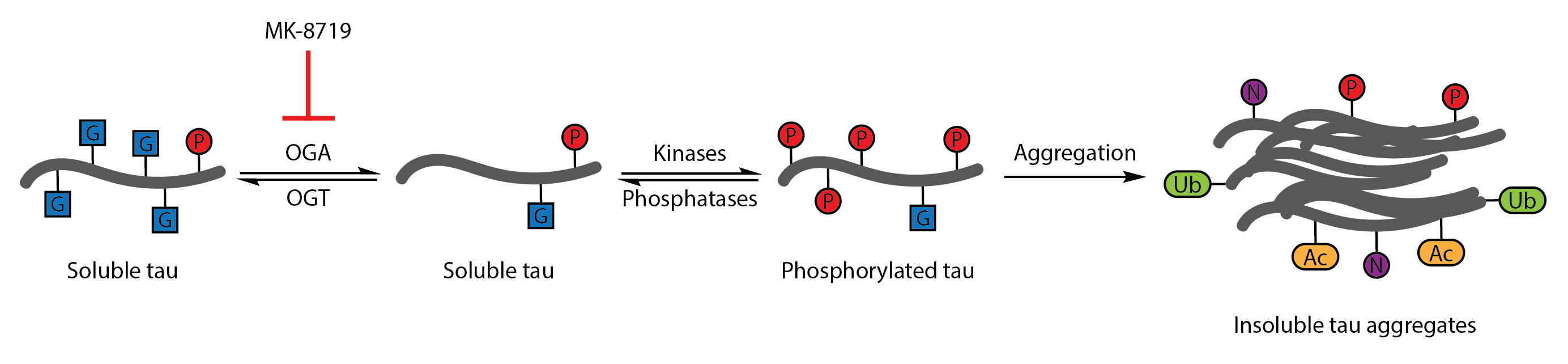
MK-8719, an OGA inhibitor, suppresses tau aggregation by elevating O-GlcNAc levels on tau. Post-translational modifications are indicated as G (O-GlcNAc), P (phosphorylation), Ub (ubiquitination), Ac (acetylation), and N (nitration). Adapted from.

To test this therapeutic hypothesis, a selective and blood-brain barrier-permeable OGA inhibitor, thiamet-G, was developed. Thiamet-G treatment was able to increase tau O-GlcNAcylation and suppress tau phosphorylation in cell culture and in vivo in healthy Sprague-Dawley rats. A subsequent study showed that thiamet-G treatment also increased tau O-GlcNAcylation in a JNPL3 tau transgenic mouse model. In this model, tau phosphorylation was not significantly affected by thiamet-G treatment, though decreased numbers of neurofibrillary tangles and slower motor neuron loss were observed. Additionally, O-GlcNAcylation of tau was noted to slow tau aggregation in vitro.

OGA inhibition with MK-8719 is being investigated in clinical trials as a potential treatment strategy for Alzheimer's disease and other tauopathies including progressive supranuclear palsy.

==== Parkinson's disease ====
Parkinson's disease is associated with aggregation of α-synuclein. As O-GlcNAc modification of α-synuclein has been found to inhibit its aggregation, elevating α-synuclein O-GlcNAc is being explored as a therapeutic strategy to treat Parkinson's disease.

=== Cancer ===
Dysregulation of O-GlcNAc is associated with cancer cell proliferation and tumor growth.

O-GlcNAcylation of the glycolytic enzyme PFK1 at S529 has been found to inhibit PFK1 enzymatic activity, reducing glycolytic flux and redirecting glucose towards the pentose phosphate pathway. Structural modeling and biochemical experiments suggested that O-GlcNAc at S529 would inhibit PFK1 allosteric activation by fructose 2,6-bisphosphate and oligomerization into active forms. In a mouse model, mice injected with cells expressing PFK1 S529A mutant showed lower tumor growth than mice injected with cells expressing PFK1 wild-type. Additionally, OGT overexpression enhanced tumor growth in the latter system but had no significant effect on the system with mutant PFK1. Hypoxia induces PFK1 S529 O-GlcNAc and increases flux through the pentose phosphate pathway to generate more NADPH, which maintains glutathione levels and detoxifies reactive oxygen species, imparting a growth advantage to cancer cells. PFK1 was found to be glycosylated in human breast and lung tumor tissues. OGT has also been reported to positively regulate HIF-1α. HIF-1α is normally degraded under normoxic conditions by prolyl hydroxylases that utilize α-ketoglutarate as a co-substrate. OGT suppresses α-ketoglutarate levels, protecting HIF-1α from proteasomal degradation by pVHL and promoting aerobic glycolysis. In contrast with the previous study on PFK1, this study found that elevating OGT or O-GlcNAc upregulated PFK1, though the two studies are consistent in finding that O-GlcNAc levels are positively associated with flux through the pentose phosphate pathway. This study also found that decreasing O-GlcNAc selectively killed cancer cells via ER stress-induced apoptosis.

Human pancreatic ductal adenocarcinoma (PDAC) cell lines have higher O-GlcNAc levels than human pancreatic duct epithelial (HPDE) cells. PDAC cells have some dependency upon O-GlcNAc for survival as OGT knockdown selectively inhibited PDAC cell proliferation (OGT knockdown did not significantly affect HPDE cell proliferation), and inhibition of OGT with 5S-GlcNAc showed the same result. Hyper-O-GlcNAcylation in PDAC cells appeared to be anti-apoptotic, inhibiting cleavage and activation of caspase-3 and caspase-9. Numerous sites on the p65 subunit of NF-κB were found to be modified by O-GlcNAc in a dynamic manner; O-GlcNAc at p65 T305 and S319 in turn positively regulate other modifications associated with NF-κB activation such as p300-mediated K310 acetylation and IKK-mediated S536 phosphorylation. These results suggested that NF-κB is constitutively activated by O-GlcNAc in pancreatic cancer.

OGT stabilization of EZH2 in various breast cancer cell lines has been found to inhibit expression of tumor suppressor genes. In hepatocellular carcinoma models, O-GlcNAc is associated with activating phosphorylation of HDAC1, which in turn regulates expression of the cell cycle regulator p21^{Waf1/Cip1} and cell motility regulator E-cadherin.

OGT has been found to stabilize SREBP-1 and activate lipogenesis in breast cancer cell lines. This stabilization was dependent on the proteasome and AMPK. OGT knockdown resulted in decreased nuclear SREBP-1, but proteasomal inhibition with MG132 blocked this effect. OGT knockdown also increased the interaction between SREBP-1 and the E3 ubiquitin ligase FBW7. AMPK is activated by T172 phosphorylation upon OGT knockdown, and AMPK phosphorylates SREBP-1 S372 to inhibit its cleavage and maturation. OGT knockdown had a diminished effect on SREBP-1 levels in AMPK-null cell lines. In a mouse model, OGT knockdown inhibited tumor growth but SREBP-1 overexpression partly rescued this effect. These results contrast from those of a previous study which found that OGT knockdown/inhibition inhibited AMPK T172 phosphorylation and increased lipogenesis.

In breast and prostate cancer cell lines, high levels of OGT and O-GlcNAc have been associated both in vitro and in vivo with processes associated with disease progression, e.g., angiogenesis, invasion, and metastasis. OGT knockdown or inhibition was found to downregulate the transcription factor FoxM1 and upregulate the cell-cycle inhibitor p27^{Kip1} (which is regulated by FoxM1-dependent expression of the E3 ubiquitin ligase component Skp2), causing G1 cell cycle arrest. This appeared to be dependent on proteasomal degradation of FoxM1, as expression of a FoxM1 mutant lacking a degron rescued the effects of OGT knockdown. FoxM1 was found not to be directly modified by O-GlcNAc, suggesting that hyper-O-GlcNAcylation of FoxM1 regulators impairs FoxM1 degradation. Targeting OGT also lowered levels of FoxM1-regulated proteins associated with cancer invasion and metastasis (MMP-2 & MMP-9), and angiogenesis (VEGF). O-GlcNAc modification of cofilin S108 has also been reported to be important for breast cancer cell invasion by regulating cofilin subcellular localization in invadopodia.

=== Diabetes ===
Dysregulation of O-GlcNAc has been associated with diabetes and associated diabetic complications. In general, elevated O-GlcNAc is associated with an insulin resistance phenotype.

Pancreatic β cells synthesize and secrete insulin to regulate blood glucose levels. One study found that inhibition of OGA with streptozotocin followed by glucosamine treatment resulted in O-GlcNAc accumulation and apoptosis in β cells; a subsequent study showed that a galactose-based analogue of streptozotocin was unable to inhibit OGA but still resulted in apoptosis, suggesting that the apoptotic effects of streptozotocin are not directly due to OGA inhibition.

O-GlcNAc has been suggested to attenuate insulin signaling. In 3T3-L1 adipocytes, OGA inhibition with PUGNAc inhibited insulin-mediated glucose uptake. PUGNAc treatment also inhibited insulin-stimulated Akt T308 phosphorylation and downstream GSK3β S9 phosphorylation. In a later study, insulin stimulation of COS-7 cells caused OGT to localize to the plasma membrane. Inhibition of PI3K with wortmannin reversed this effect, suggesting dependence on phosphatidylinositol(3,4,5)-triphosphate. Increasing O-GlcNAc levels by subjecting cells to high glucose conditions or PUGNAc treatment inhibited insulin-stimulated phosphorylation of Akt T308 and Akt activity. IRS1 phosphorylation at S307 and S632/S635, which is associated with attenuated insulin signaling, was enhanced. Subsequent experiments in mice with adenoviral delivery of OGT showed that OGT overexpression negatively regulated insulin signaling in vivo. Many components of the insulin signaling pathway, including β-catenin, IR-β, IRS1, Akt, PDK1, and the p110α subunit of PI3K were found to be directly modified by O-GlcNAc. Insulin signaling has also been reported to lead to OGT tyrosine phosphorylation and OGT activation, resulting in increased O-GlcNAc levels.

As PUGNAc also inhibits lysosomal β-hexosaminidases, the OGA-selective inhibitor NButGT was developed to further probe the relationship between O-GlcNAc and insulin signaling in 3T3-L1 adipocytes. This study also found that PUGNAc resulted in impaired insulin signaling, but NButGT did not, as measured by changes in phosphorylation of Akt T308, suggesting that the effects observed with PUGNAc may be due to off-target effects besides OGA inhibition.

=== Infectious disease ===
==== Bacterial ====
Treatment of macrophages with lipopolysaccharide (LPS), a major component of the Gram-negative bacteria outer membrane, results in elevated O-GlcNAc in cellular and mouse models. During infection, cytosolic OGT was de-S-nitrosylated and activated. Suppressing O-GlcNAc with DON inhibited the O-GlcNAcylation and nuclear translocation of NF-κB, as well as downstream induction of inducible nitric oxide synthase and IL-1β production. DON treatment also improved cell survival during LPS treatment.

==== Viral ====
O-GlcNAc has been implicated in influenza A virus (IAV)-induced cytokine storm. Specifically, O-GlcNAcylation of S430 on interferon regulatory factor-5 (IRF5) has been shown to promote its interaction with TNF receptor-associated factor 6 (TRAF6) in cellular and mouse models. TRAF6 mediates K63-linked ubiquitination of IRF5 which is necessary for IRF5 activity and subsequent cytokine production. Analysis of clinical samples showed that blood glucose levels were elevated in IAV-infected patients compared to healthy individuals. In IAV-infected patients, blood glucose levels positively correlated with IL-6 and IL-8 levels. O-GlcNAcylation of IRF5 was also relatively higher in peripheral blood mononuclear cells of IAV-infected patients.

=== Other applications ===
Peptide therapeutics such as are attractive for their high specificity and potency, but they often have poor pharmacokinetic profiles due to their degradation by serum proteases. Though O-GlcNAc is generally associated with intracellular proteins, it has been found that engineered peptide therapeutics modified by O-GlcNAc have enhanced serum stability in a mouse model and have similar structure and activity compared to the respective unmodified peptides. This method has been applied to engineer GLP-1 and PTH peptides.

== See also ==
- O-GlcNAc transferase (OGT)
- O-GlcNAcase (OGA)
- O-linked glycosylation
