= Uridine diphospho-N-acetylglucosamine:polypeptide beta-N-acetylglucosaminyltransferase =

Uridine diphospho-N-acetylglucosamine:polypeptide beta-N-acetylglucosaminyltransferase may refer to the following:

- Protein O-GlcNAc transferase, an enzyme
- Protein N-acetylglucosaminyltransferase, an enzyme
