= Ceperognastat =

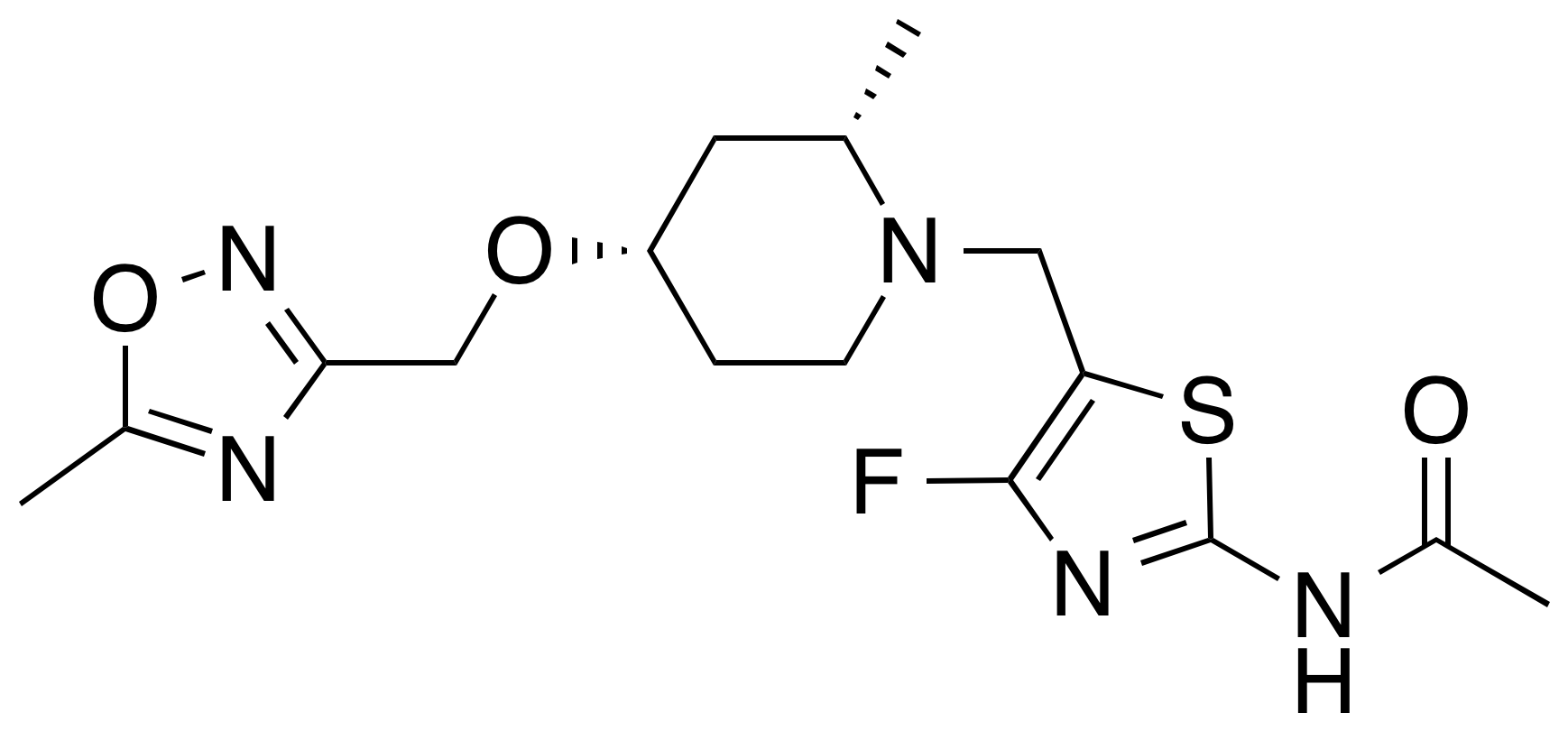

Names
- IUPAC name N-[4-fluoro-5-[[2-methyl-4-[(5-methyl-1,2,4-oxadiazol-3-yl)methoxy]piperidin-1-yl]methyl]-1,3-thiazol-2-yl]acetamide

Identifiers
CAS Number	2241514-56-5
3D model (JSmol)	Interactive image
ChemSpider	129432852
PubChem CID	135271363
- InChI: InChI=1S/C16H22FN5O3S/c1-9-6-12(24-8-14-19-11(3)25-21-14)4-5-22(9)7-13-15(17)20-16(26-13)18-10(2)23/h9,12H,4-8H2,1-3H3,(H,18,20,23) Key: FRVXHWNHGWUTQO-UHFFFAOYSA-N
- SMILES: CC(NC1=NC(F)=C(CN2CC[C@H](OCC3=NOC(C)=N3)C[C@@H]2C)S1)=O

Properties
Chemical formula	C_{16}H_{22}FN_{5}O_{3}S
Molar mass	383.44 g·mol^{−1}
- Except where otherwise noted, data are given for materials in their standard state (at 25 °C [77 °F], 100 kPa). Infobox references

Ceperognastat (LY3372689) is a drug candidate molecule under investigation to treat Alzheimer's disease. It targets the enzyme O-GlcNAcase. Its result is to reduce formation of tau protein tangles.

A molecule containing radioactive fluorine was used with a PET scan to show that ceperognastat binds in the human brain.

Ceperognastat was discovered via a high-throughput screening campaign followed by further optimization.

Eli Lilly and Company is recruiting subjects for a clinical trial. Some hospitals in Australia: St Vincent's Hospital, Sydney Hornsby Ku-Ring-Gai Hospital, The Prince Charles Hospital, The Queen Elizabeth Hospital, Adelaide, Box Hill Hospital, and Delmont Private Hospital are involved. Results of the trial were expected by June 2024. Primary completion of the study occurred on 9th July 2024, with full completion expected in August 2024. In an investor call, it was disclosed that ceperognastat missed the primary endpoint of improvement on the Integrated Alzheimer's Disease Rating Scale. The detailed results of this study are expected to be disclosed at a conference in late 2024.

== Chemical ==
The molecule contains three rings: thiazole, piperidine and oxadiazole. Other functional groups included are an ether, acetamide, and a fluoride.
