= EOGT =

Enzyme found in humans

Identifiers
- Aliases: EOGT, AER61, AOS4, C3orf64, EOGT1, EGF domain specific O-linked N-acetylglucosamine transferase
- External IDs: OMIM: 614789; MGI: 2141669; GeneCards: EOGT
Enzyme activity
EC #	BRENDA	ExPASy	KEGG	MetaCyc
2.4.1.255	↗	↗	↗	↗

Gene location (Human)
Chr.	Chromosome 3 (human)
Band	3p14.1	Start	68,975,217 bp
Band	3p14.1	End	69,013,684 bp

Gene location (Mouse)
Chr.	Chromosome 6 (mouse)
Band	6|6 D3	Start	97,110,024 bp
Band	6|6 D3	End	97,149,182 bp
RNA expression pattern
Bgee	Human / Mouse (ortholog); Top expressed in: thoracic aorta; ascending aorta; right coronary artery; Descending thoracic aorta; right lung; tibial arteries; Achilles tendon; gastric mucosa; left coronary artery; secondary oocyte / Top expressed in: tail of embryo; iris; ciliary body; hair follicle; aortic valve; stria vascularis; decidua; ascending aorta; left lung lobe; gastrula; More reference expression data
BioGPS	n/a
Gene ontology
Molecular function	transferase activity; protein N-acetylglucosaminyltransferase activity; glycosyltransferase activity
Cellular component	endoplasmic reticulum lumen; endoplasmic reticulum
Biological process	protein O-linked glycosylation
Sources:Amigo / QuickGO
Orthologs
Databases	NCBI: entry; OMA: entry
Species	Human	Mouse
Entrez	285203	101351
Ensembl	ENSG00000163378	ENSMUSG00000035245
UniProt	Q5NDL2	Q8BYW9
RefSeq (mRNA)	NM_001278689; NM_173654	NM_175313
RefSeq (protein)	NP_001265618; NP_775925	NP_780522
Location (UCSC)	Chr 3: 68.98 – 69.01 Mb	Chr 6: 97.11 – 97.15 Mb
PubMed search
- Wikidata
View/Edit Human	View/Edit Mouse

EGF domain-specific O-linked N-acetylglucosamine transferase (EOGT) is an enzyme that in humans is encoded by the gene EOGT. Like the related enzyme OGT, this enzyme functions as a protein O-GlcNAc transferase, meaning it modifies proteins by transferring an N-acetylglucosamine to a threonine or serine residue. EOGT specifically glycosylates a particular threonine residue located in folded EGF-like domains (located between the fifth and sixth conserved cysteines). It is located inside the lumen of the endoplasmic reticulum, and may play an important role in notch signaling.

== Medical Significance ==
Pathogenic mutations in EOGT are associated with Adams-Oliver syndrome, a disorder associated with aplasia cutis congenita (patches of missing skins), and defects in the extremities like missing finger nails or the last (distal) finger bone in fingers. The EOGT-liked form has been designated Adams-Oliver syndrome-4 (AOS4), and appears to follow an autosomal receptive pattern.
