= PUGNAc =

Chemical compound

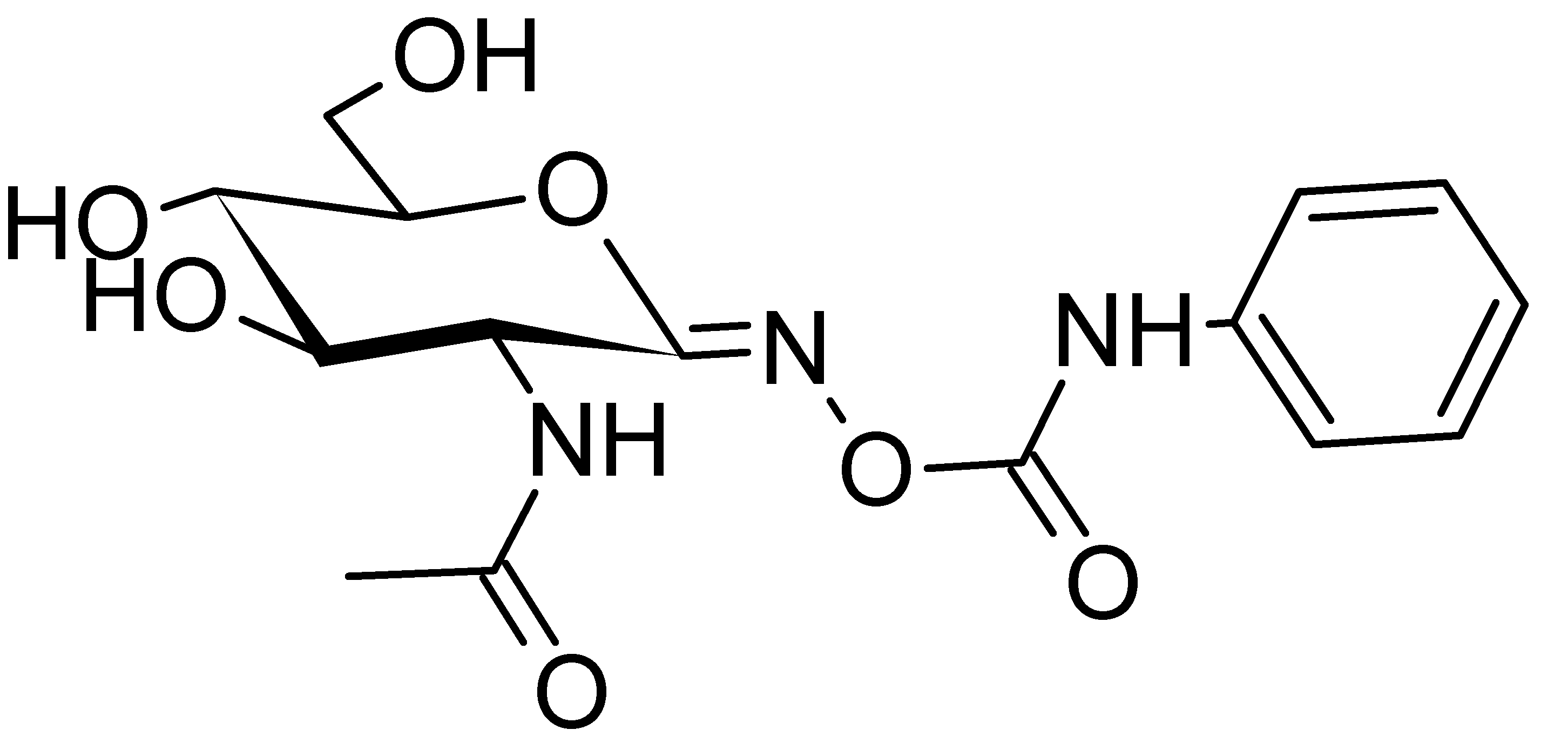

Clinical data
- Pregnancy category: ?
- Routes of administration: Oral

Identifiers
- IUPAC name: O-(2-Acetamido-2-deoxy-D-glucopyranosylidene)amino N-phenyl carbamate
- CAS Number: 132489-69-1
- PubChem CID: 9576811
- UNII: AWZ7VE64B6
- ChEBI: CHEBI:44601
- CompTox Dashboard (EPA): DTXSID101117756

Chemical and physical data
- Formula: C_{15}H_{19}N_{3}O_{7}
- Molar mass: 353.331 g·mol^{−1}

PUGNAc is a 1,5-hydroximolactone, acting as an inhibitor of a variety of N-acetylhexosaminidases. It was long thought that increased levels of O-GlcNAc in human cells lead to Type II diabetes. O-GlcNAc levels were artificially raised with PUGNAc, which inhibits O-GlcNAcase, a beta-exo-N-acetylhexosaminidase which cleaves beta-O-linked-N-acetylglucosamine residues from glycoproteins. As a result of this inhibition, a type II diabetic phenotype was observed. Recent pharmacological studies using a more selective O-GlcNAcase inhibitor did not see this effect. However, genetic manipulation of O-GlcNAc levels is consistent with the effects observed by PUGNAc, namely insulin resistance upon elevation of O-GlcNAc levels.

== In popular culture ==
PUGNAc was used by Michael Scofield in the television series Prison Break to keep his blood sugar level high to appear diabetic.
