= A-1,3-mannosyl-glycoprotein 2-b-N-acetylglucosaminyltransferase =

Class of enzymes

Alpha-1,3-mannosyl-glycoprotein 2-beta-N-acetylglucosaminyltransferase

Identifiers
- EC no.: 2.4.1.101
- CAS no.: 102576-81-8

Databases
- IntEnz: IntEnz view
- BRENDA: BRENDA entry
- ExPASy: NiceZyme view
- KEGG: KEGG entry
- MetaCyc: metabolic pathway
- PRIAM: profile
- PDB structures: RCSB PDB PDBe PDBsum
Search
- PMC: articles
- PubMed: articles
- NCBI: proteins

Alpha-1,3-mannosyl-glycoprotein 2-beta-N-acetylglucosaminyltransferase (EC 2.4.1.101, N-acetylglucosaminyltransferase I, N-glycosyl-oligosaccharide-glycoprotein N-acetylglucosaminyltransferase I, uridine diphosphoacetylglucosamine-alpha-1,3-mannosylglycoprotein beta-1,2-N-acetylglucosaminyltransferase, UDP-N-acetylglucosaminyl:alpha-1,3-D-mannoside-beta-1,2-N-acetylglucosaminyltransferase I, UDP-N-acetylglucosaminyl:alpha-3-D-mannoside beta-1,2-N-acetylglucosaminyltransferase I, alpha-1,3-mannosyl-glycoprotein beta-1,2-N-acetylglucosaminyltransferase, GnTI) is an enzyme with systematic name UDP-N-acetyl-D-glucosamine:3-(alpha-D-mannosyl)-beta-D-mannosyl-glycoprotein 2-beta-N-acetyl-D-glucosaminyltransferase. This enzyme catalyses the following chemical reaction

UDP-N-acetyl-D-glucosamine + 3-(alpha-D-mannosyl)-beta-D-mannosyl-R $\rightleftharpoons$ UDP + 3-(2-[N-acetyl-beta-D-glucosaminyl]-alpha-D-mannosyl)-beta-D-mannosyl-R

R represents the remainder of the N-linked oligosaccharide in the glycoprotein acceptor.
