= Protein O-GlcNAcase =

Protein-coding gene in the species Homo sapiens

OGA
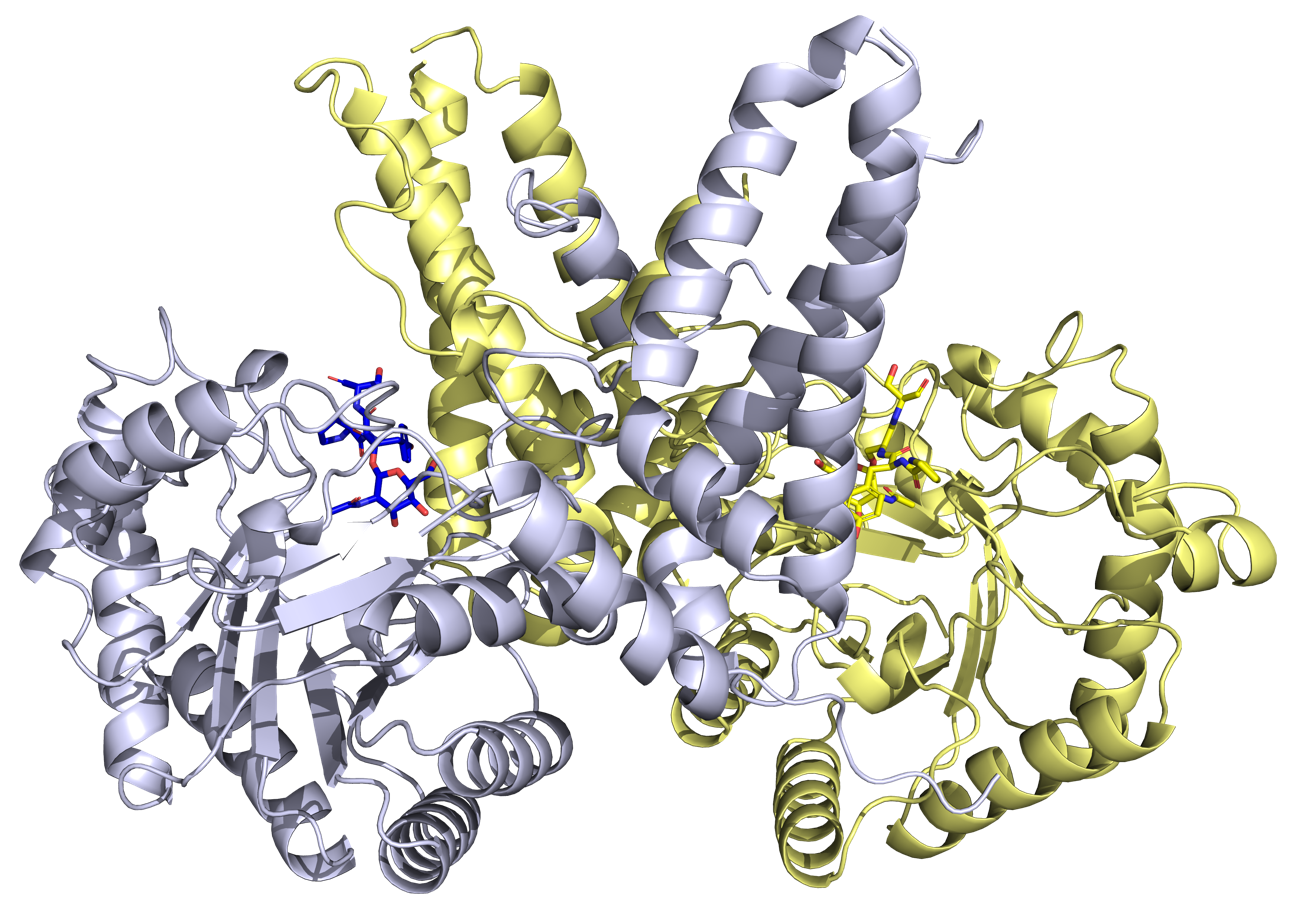

Identifiers
- Aliases: OGA, MEA5, NCOAT, meningioma expressed antigen 5 (hyaluronidase), MGEA5, O-GlcNAcase
- External IDs: OMIM: 604039; MGI: 1932139; GeneCards: OGA
Available structures
| PDB | Ortholog search: PDBe RCSB |
| PDB | List of PDB id codes 2YDQ |
Enzyme activity
| EC # | BRENDA | ExPASy | KEGG | MetaCyc |
|---|---|---|---|---|
| 3.2.1.169 | ↗ | ↗ | ↗ | ↗ |

Gene location (Human)
| Chr. | Chromosome 10 (human) |
| Band | 10q24.32 | Start | 101,784,443 bp |
| Band | 10q24.32 | End | 101,818,465 bp |

Gene location (Mouse)
| Chr. | Chromosome 19 (mouse) |
| Band | 19 C3|19 38.75 cM | Start | 45,738,698 bp |
| Band | 19 C3|19 38.75 cM | End | 45,772,276 bp |
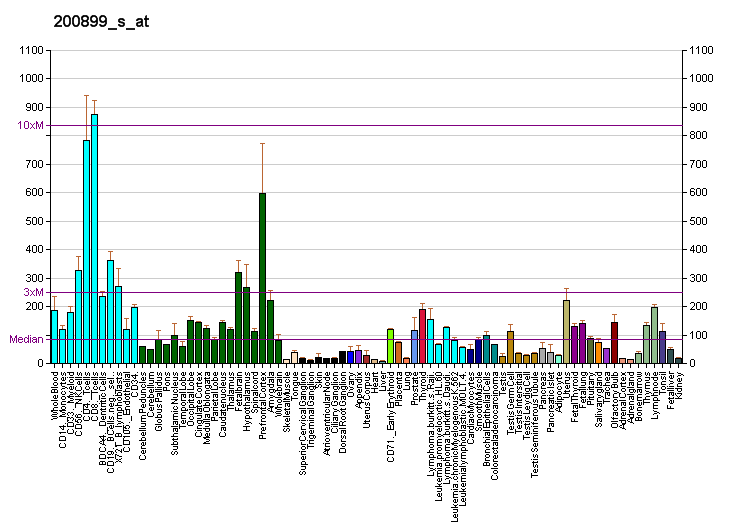

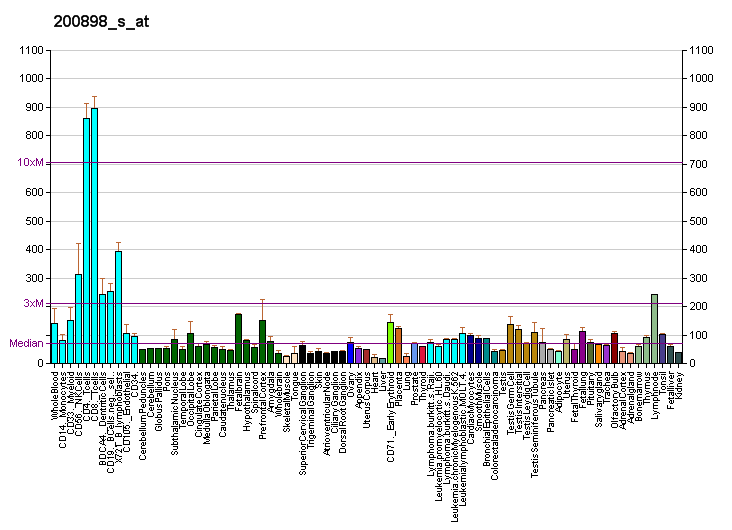
RNA expression pattern
| Bgee | Human / Mouse (ortholog); Top expressed in: sperm; skin of abdomen; skin of leg; cerebellar hemisphere; tibial nerve; right uterine tube; gastric mucosa; right hemisphere of cerebellum; left ovary; ventricular zone / Top expressed in: saccule; otic placode; otic vesicle; fossa; vestibular membrane of cochlear duct; conjunctival fornix; epithelium of lens; motor neuron; ciliary body; vestibular sensory epithelium; More reference expression data |
| BioGPS | More reference expression data |
Gene ontology
| Molecular function | hyalurononglucosaminidase activity; beta-N-acetylglucosaminidase activity; hydrolase activity; hydrolase activity, acting on glycosyl bonds; [protein-3-O-(N-acetyl-D-glucosaminyl)-L-threonine O-N-acetyl-alpha-D-glucosaminase activity]; [protein-3-O-(N-acetyl-D-glucosaminyl)-L-serine O-N-acetyl-alpha-D-glucosaminase activity]; [protein-3-O-(N-acetyl-D-glucosaminyl)-L-serine/L-threonine O-N-acetyl-alpha-D-glucosaminase activity] |
| Cellular component | cytoplasm; cytosol; membrane; nucleus |
| Biological process | metabolism; protein deglycosylation; N-acetylglucosamine metabolic process; glycoprotein catabolic process; protein O-linked glycosylation; glycoprotein metabolic process; viral process |
Sources:Amigo / QuickGO
Orthologs
| Databases | NCBI: entry; OMA: entry |
| Species | Human | Mouse |
| Entrez | 10724 | 76055 |
| Ensembl | ENSG00000198408 | ENSMUSG00000025220 |
| UniProt | O60502 | Q9EQQ9 |
| RefSeq (mRNA) | NM_001142434; NM_012215 | NM_023799 |
| RefSeq (protein) | NP_001135906; NP_036347 | NP_076288 |
| Location (UCSC) | Chr 10: 101.78 – 101.82 Mb | Chr 19: 45.74 – 45.77 Mb |
| PubMed search |
- Wikidata
| View/Edit Human | View/Edit Mouse |

Protein O-GlcNAcase (EC 3.2.1.169) is an enzyme that in humans is encoded by the OGA gene. This enzyme's systematic name is (protein)-3-O-(N-acetyl-D-glucosaminyl)-L-serine/threonine N-acetylglucosaminyl hydrolase. This enzyme catalyses the removal of the O-GlcNAc post-translational modification in the following chemical reaction:

1. [protein]-3-O-(N-acetyl-β-D-glucosaminyl)-L-serine + H_{2}O ⇌ [protein]-L-serine + N-acetyl-D-glucosamine
2. [protein]-3-O-(N-acetyl-β-D-glucosaminyl)-L-threonine + H_{2}O ⇌ [protein]-L-threonine + N-acetyl-D-glucosamine

== Nomenclature ==
Protein O-GlcNAcase
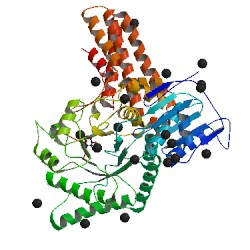

Identifiers
- EC no.: 3.2.1.169

Databases
- BRENDA: enzyme data
- ExPASy: NiceZyme view
- KEGG: enzyme entry
- MetaCyc: metabolic pathway
- Rhea: reactions
- PDB structures: RCSB PDB PDBe PDBsum
Search
- PMC: articles
- PubMed: articles
- NCBI: proteins

Other names include:

- Nuclear cytoplasmic O-GlcNAcase and acetyltransferase
- Glycoside hydrolase O-GlcNAcase
- O-GlcNAcase
- BtGH84
- O-GlcNAc hydrolase

== Isoforms ==
The human OGA gene is capable of producing two different transcripts, each capable of encoding a different OGA isoform. The long isoform L-OGA, a bifunctional enzyme that possess a glycoside hydrolase activity and a pseudo histone-acetyl transferase domain, primarily resides in the cytoplasm and the nucleus. The short isoform S-OGA, which only exhibit the glycoside hydrolase domain, was initially described as residing within the nucleus. However, more recent work showed that S-OGA is located in mitochondria and regulates reactive oxygen production in this organelle. Another isoform, resulting from proteolytic cleavage of L-OGA, has also been described. All three isoforms exhibit glycoside hydrolase activity.

== Homologs ==
Protein O-GlcNAcases belong to glycoside hydrolase family 84 of the carbohydrate active enzyme classification. Homologs exist in other species as O-GlcNAcase is conserved in higher eukaryotic species. In a pairwise alignment, humans share 55% homology with Drosophila and 43% with C. elegans. Drosophila and C. elegans share 43% homology. Among mammals, the OGA sequence is even more highly conserved. The mouse and the human have 97.8% homology. However, OGA does not share significant homology with other proteins. However, short stretches of about 200 amino acids in OGA have homology with some proteins such as hyaluronidase, a putative acetyltransferase, eukaryotic translation elongation factor-1γ, and the 11-1 polypeptide.

== Reaction ==
=== Protein O-GlcNAcylation ===
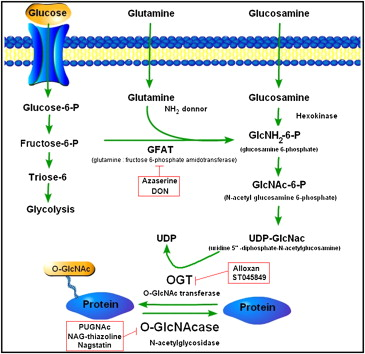
Metabolic pathway for OGA

O-GlcNAcylation is a form of glycosylation, the site-specific enzymatic addition of saccharides to proteins and lipids. This form of glycosylation is with O-linked β-N-acetylglucosamine or β-O-linked 2-acetamido-2-deoxy-D-glycopyranose (O-GlcNAc). In this form, a single sugar (β-N-acetylglucosamine) is added to serine and threonine residues of nuclear or cytoplasmic proteins. Two conserved enzymes control this glycosylation of serine and threonine: O-GlcNAc transferase (OGT) and O-GlcNAcase (OGA). While OGT catalyzes the addition of O-GlcNAc to serine and threonine, OGA catalyzes the hydrolytic cleavage of O-GlcNAc from post-transitionally modified proteins.

OGA is a member of the family of hexosaminidases. However, unlike lysosomal hexosaminidases, OGA activity is the highest at neutral pH (approximately 7) and it localizes mainly to the cytosol. OGA and OGT are synthesized from two conserved genes and are expressed throughout the human body with high levels in the brain and pancreas. The products of O-GlcNAc and the process itself plays a role in embryonic development, brain activity, hormone production, and a myriad of other activities.

Over 600 proteins are targets for O-GlcNAcylation. While the functional effects of O-GlcNAc modification is not fully known, it is known that O-GlcNAc modification impacts many cellular activities such as lipid/carbohydrate metabolism and hexosamine biosynthesis. Modified proteins may modulate various downstream signaling pathways by influencing transcription and proteomic activities.

=== Mechanism and inhibition ===
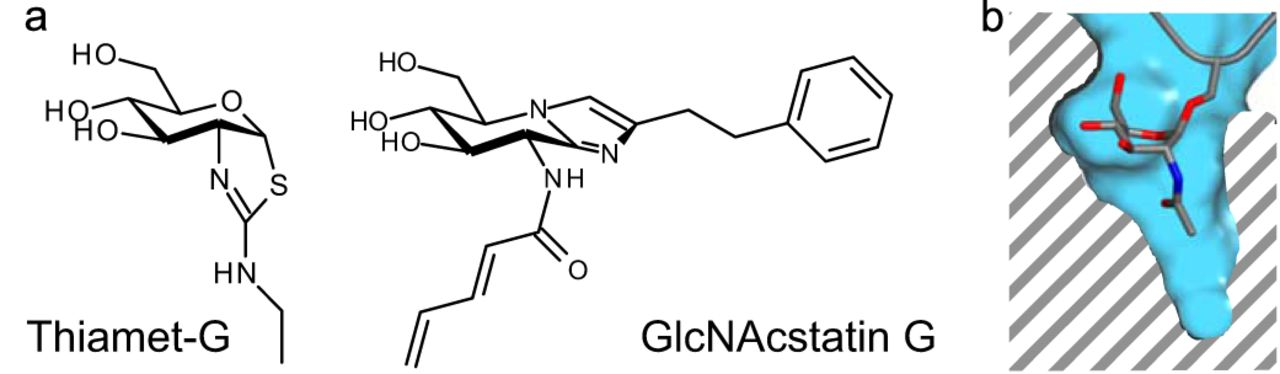
a. Inhibitors for OGA b. Cross section of active site

OGA catalyzes O-GlcNAc hydrolysis via an oxazoline reaction intermediate. Stable compounds which mimic the reaction intermediate can act as selective enzyme inhibitors. Thiazoline derivatives of GlcNAc can be used as a reaction intermediate. An example of this includes Thiamet-G as shown on the right. A second form of inhibition can occur from the mimicry of the transition state. The GlcNAcstatin family of inhibitors exploit this mechanism in order to inhibit OGA activity. For both types of inhibitors, OGA can be selected apart from the generic lysosomal hexosaminidases by elongating the C2 substituent in their chemical structure. This takes advantage of a deep pocket in OGA's active site that allow it to bind analogs of GlcNAc.

There is potential for regulation of O-GlcNAcase for the treatment of Alzheimer's disease. When the tau protein in the brain is hyperphosphorylated, neurofibrillary tangles form, which are a pathological hallmark for neurodegenerative diseases such as Alzheimer's disease. In order to treat this condition, OGA is targeted by inhibitors such as Thiamet-G in order to prevent O-GlcNAc from being removed from tau, which assists in preventing tau from becoming phosphorylated.

== Structure ==
X-ray structures are available for a range of O-GlcNAcase proteins. The X-ray structure of human O-GlcNAcase in complex with Thiamet-G identified the structural basis of enzyme inhibition.

== See also ==
- O-GlcNAc
- O-GlcNAc transferase
- O-linked glycosylation
