= UDP-N-acetylglucosamine diphosphorylase =

Class of enzymes

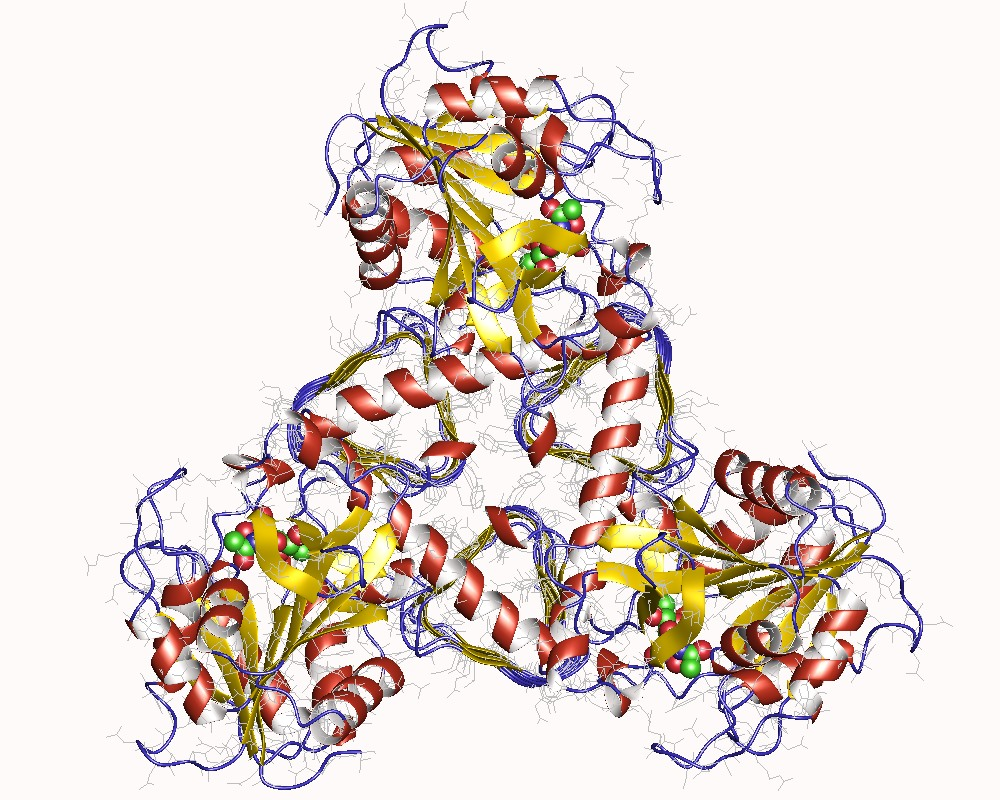
- N-acetyl glucosamine 1-phosphate uridyltransferase homotrimer, Mycobacterium tuberculosis

Identifiers
- EC no.: 2.7.7.23
- CAS no.: 9023-06-7

Databases
- IntEnz: IntEnz view
- BRENDA: BRENDA entry
- ExPASy: NiceZyme view
- KEGG: KEGG entry
- MetaCyc: metabolic pathway
- PRIAM: profile
- PDB structures: RCSB PDB PDBe PDBsum
- Gene Ontology: AmiGO / QuickGO
Search
- PMC: articles
- PubMed: articles
- NCBI: proteins

UDP-N-acetylglucosamine diphosphorylase (EC 2.7.7.23) is an enzyme that catalyzes the reversible chemical reaction

uridine triphosphate
+
(1)
PP_{i}
PP_{i}
uridine diphosphate N-acetylglucosamine

The enzyme first characterised from sheep brain combines uridine triphosphate and N-acetyl-α-D-glucosamine 1-phosphate (1) to give uridine diphosphate N-acetylglucosamine (UDP-GlcNAc), with pyrophosphate (PP_{i}) as a byproduct. Initially, the enzyme was found to be catalysing the breakdown of UDP-GlcNAc but subsequent studies of the enzyme from Escherichia coli showed it to be involved in the biosynthesis of that compound.

The crystal structure of two human isoforms of the enzyme have been determined.

== Nomenclature ==
This enzyme is a transferase, specifically one transferring phosphorus-containing nucleotide groups (nucleotidyltransferases). The systematic name of this enzyme class is UTP:N-acetyl-alpha-D-glucosamine-1-phosphate uridylyltransferase. Other names in common use include UDP-N-acetylglucosamine pyrophosphorylase, uridine diphosphoacetylglucosamine pyrophosphorylase, UTP:2-acetamido-2-deoxy-alpha-D-glucose-1-phosphate, uridylyltransferase, UDP-GlcNAc pyrophosphorylase, GlmU uridylyltransferase, Acetylglucosamine 1-phosphate uridylyltransferase, UDP-acetylglucosamine pyrophosphorylase, uridine diphosphate-N-acetylglucosamine pyrophosphorylase, uridine diphosphoacetylglucosamine phosphorylase, and acetylglucosamine 1-phosphate uridylyltransferase.
