= Protein O-GlcNAc transferase =

Protein-coding gene in the species Homo sapiens

OGT
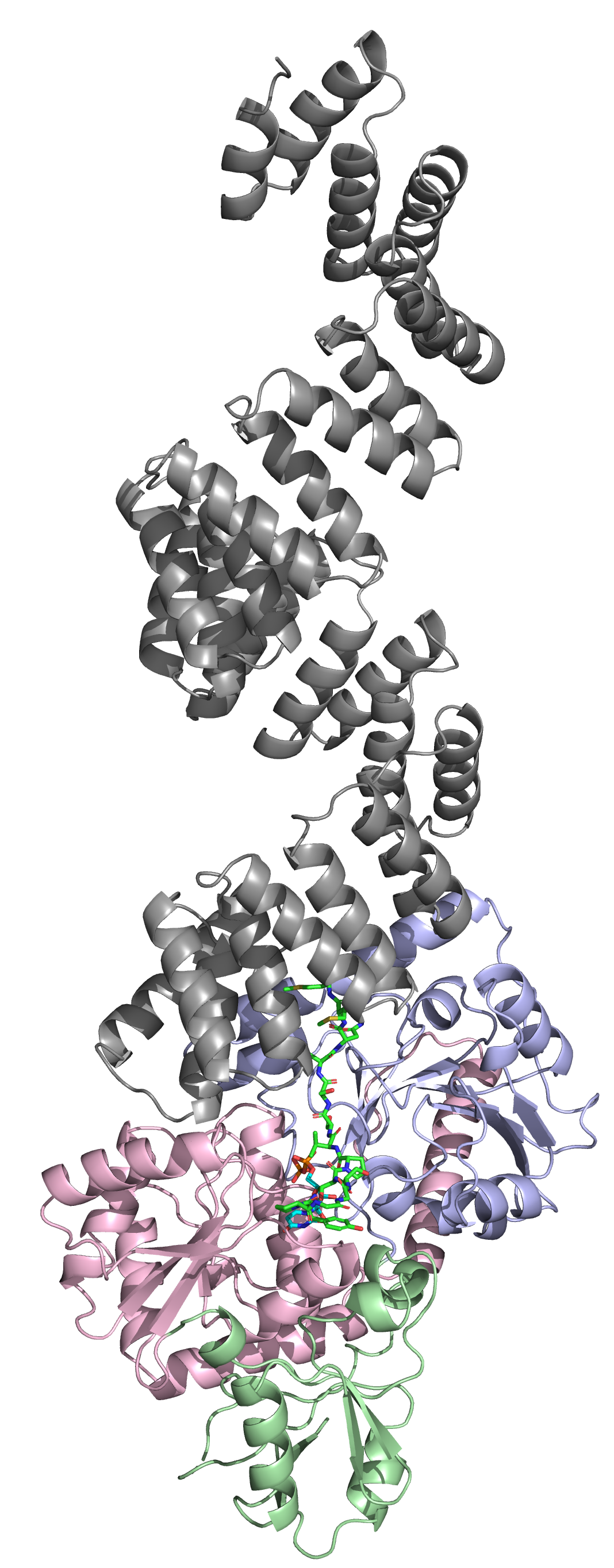

Identifiers
- Aliases: OGT, HRNT1, O-GLCNAC, HINCUT-1, O-linked N-acetylglucosamine (GlcNAc) transferase, OGT1, MRX106, XLID106
- External IDs: OMIM: 300255; MGI: 1339639; GeneCards: OGT
Available structures
PDB	Ortholog search: PDBe RCSB
PDB	List of PDB id codes 1W3B, 3PE3, 3PE4, 3TAX, 4AY5, 4AY6, 4CDR, 4GYW, 4GYY, 4GZ3, 4GZ5, 4GZ6, 4N39, 4N3A, 4N3B, 4XI9, 4XIF, 5BNW, 5C1D
Enzyme activity
EC #	BRENDA	ExPASy	KEGG	MetaCyc
2.4.1.255	↗	↗	↗	↗

Gene location (Human)
Chr.	X chromosome (human)
Band	Xq13.1	Start	71,533,104 bp
Band	Xq13.1	End	71,575,892 bp

Gene location (Mouse)
Chr.	X chromosome (mouse)
Band	X|X D	Start	100,683,666 bp
Band	X|X D	End	100,727,957 bp
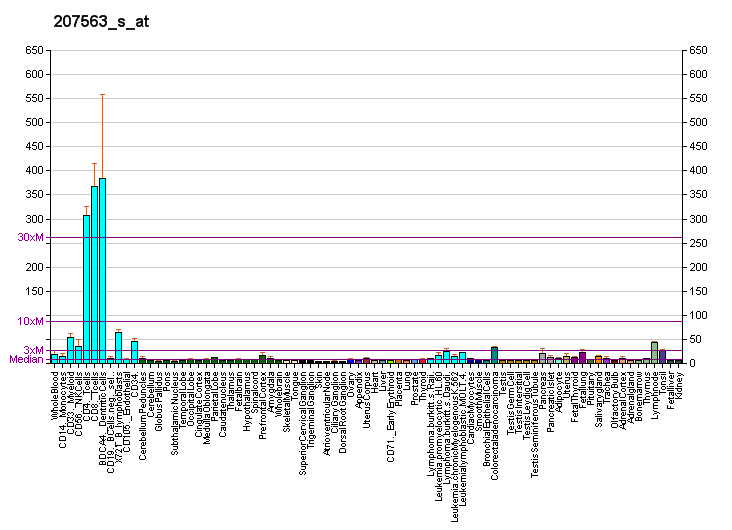

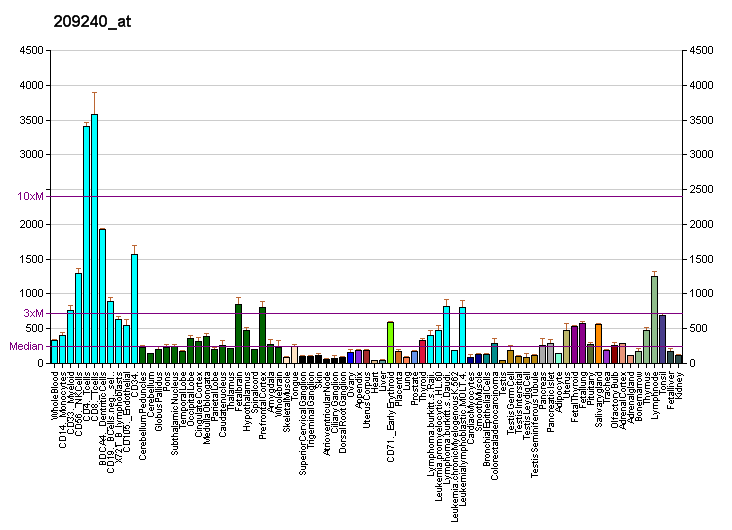

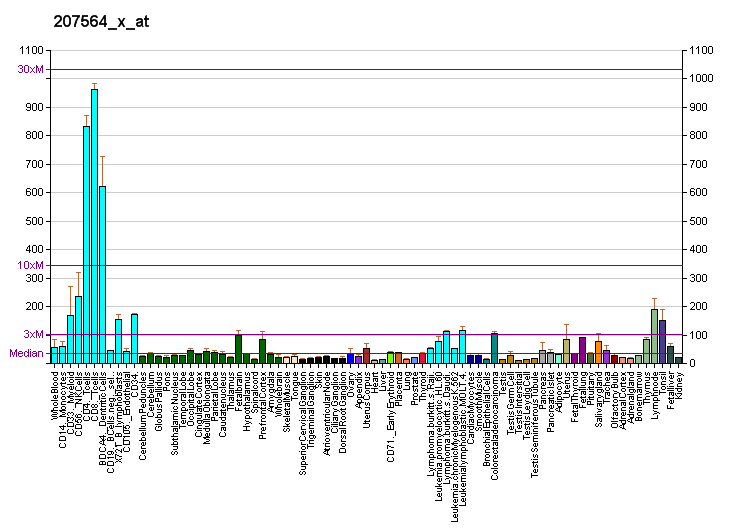
RNA expression pattern
Bgee	Human / Mouse (ortholog); Top expressed in: middle temporal gyrus; Brodmann area 23; skin of hip; right uterine tube; tibia; visceral pleura; epithelium of nasopharynx; skin of thigh; parietal pleura; trabecular bone / Top expressed in: medullary collecting duct; genital tubercle; utricle; granulocyte; olfactory bulb; iris; cerebellar cortex; dorsal striatum; vas deferens; lobe of cerebellum; More reference expression data
BioGPS	More reference expression data
Gene ontology
Molecular function	lipid binding; transferase activity; acetylglucosaminyltransferase activity; glycosyltransferase activity; histone acetyltransferase activity (H4-K8 specific); histone acetyltransferase activity (H4-K5 specific); protein O-GlcNAc transferase activity; protein binding; histone acetyltransferase activity (H4-K16 specific); phosphatidylinositol-3,4,5-trisphosphate binding; protein N-acetylglucosaminyltransferase activity
Cellular component	cytoplasm; membrane; plasma membrane; mitochondrion; histone acetyltransferase complex; nucleus; cytosol; nucleoplasm; protein-containing complex; mitochondrial membranes; cell projection; protein N-acetylglucosaminyltransferase complex
Biological process	response to nutrient; rhythmic process; histone H3-K4 trimethylation; protein O-linked glycosylation; regulation of Rac protein signal transduction; circadian regulation of gene expression; regulation of glycolytic process; histone H4-K5 acetylation; response to insulin; protein glycosylation; positive regulation of proteolysis; positive regulation of histone H3-K27 methylation; histone H4-K16 acetylation; histone H4-K8 acetylation; phosphatidylinositol-mediated signaling; signal transduction; positive regulation of transcription by RNA polymerase II; regulation of insulin receptor signaling pathway; apoptotic process; protein deubiquitination; protein processing; regulation of transcription by RNA polymerase II; negative regulation of protein ubiquitination; negative regulation of proteasomal ubiquitin-dependent protein catabolic process; chromatin organization; regulation of gluconeogenesis; viral process; positive regulation of cold-induced thermogenesis
Sources:Amigo / QuickGO
Orthologs
Databases	NCBI: entry; OMA: entry
Species	Human	Mouse
Entrez	8473	108155
Ensembl	ENSG00000147162	ENSMUSG00000034160
UniProt	O15294	Q8CGY8
RefSeq (mRNA)	NM_003605; NM_181672; NM_181673; NM_025192	NM_001290535; NM_139144
RefSeq (protein)	NP_858058; NP_858059	NP_001277464; NP_631883
Location (UCSC)	Chr X: 71.53 – 71.58 Mb	Chr X: 100.68 – 100.73 Mb
PubMed search
- Wikidata
View/Edit Human	View/Edit Mouse

Protein O-GlcNAc transferase also known as OGT or O-linked N-acetylglucosaminyltransferase is an enzyme (EC 2.4.1.255) that in humans is encoded by the OGT gene. OGT catalyzes the addition of the O-GlcNAc post-translational modification to proteins.

== Nomenclature ==
Other names include:

- O-GlcNAc transferase
- OGTase
- O-linked N-acetylglucosaminyltransferase
- Uridine diphospho-N-acetylglucosamine:polypeptide β-N-acetylglucosaminyltransferase

Systematic name: UDP-N-α-acetyl-d-glucosamine:[protein]-3-O-N-acetyl-β-d-glucosaminyl transferase

== Function ==
O-GlcNAc transferase

Identifiers
- EC no.: 2.4.1.255

Databases
- BRENDA: enzyme data
- ExPASy: NiceZyme view
- KEGG: enzyme entry
- MetaCyc: metabolic pathway
- Rhea: reactions
- PDB structures: RCSB PDB PDBe PDBsum
Search
- PMC: articles
- PubMed: articles
- NCBI: proteins

=== Glycosyltransferase ===
OGT catalyzes the addition of a single N-acetylglucosamine through an O-glycosidic linkage to serine or threonine and an S-glycosidic linkage to cysteine residues of nucleocytoplasmic proteins. Since both phosphorylation and O-GlcNAcylation compete for similar serine or threonine residues, the two processes may compete for sites, or they may alter the substrate specificity of nearby sites by steric or electrostatic effects. Two transcript variants encoding cytoplasmic and mitochondrial isoforms have been found for this gene. OGT glycosylates many proteins including: Histone H2B, AKT1, PFKL, KMT2E/MLL5, MAPT/TAU, Host cell factor C1, and SIN3A.

O-GlcNAc transferase is a part of a host of biological functions within the human body. OGT is involved in the resistance of insulin in muscle cells and adipocytes by inhibiting the Threonine 308 phosphorylation of AKT1, increasing the rate of IRS1 phosphorylation (at serine 307 and serine 632/635), reducing insulin signaling, and glycosylating components of insulin signals. Additionally, O-GlcNAc transferase catalyzes intracellular glycosylation of serine and threonine residues with the addition of N-acetylglucosamine. Studies show that OGT alleles are vital for embryogenesis, and that OGT is necessary for intracellular glycosylation and embryonic stem cell vitality. O-GlcNAc transferase also catalyzes the posttranslational modification that modifies transcription factors and RNA polymerase II, however the specific function of this modification is mostly unknown.

=== Protease ===
OGT cleaves Host Cell Factor C1, at one or more of 6 repeating 26 amino acid sequences. The TPR domain of OGT binds to the carboxyl terminal portion of an HCF1 proteolytic repeat so that the cleavage region is in the glycosyltransferase active site above uridine-diphosphate-GlcNAc The large proportion of OGT complexed with HCF1 is necessary for HCF1 cleavage, and HCFC1 is required for OGT stabilization in the nucleus. HCF1 regulates OGT stability using a post-transcriptional mechanism, however the mechanism of the interaction with HCFC1 is still unknown.

== Structure ==
The human OGT gene has 1046 amino acid residues, and is a heterotrimer consisting of two 110 kDa subunits and one 78 kDa subunit. The 110 kDa subunit contains 13 tetratricopeptide repeats (TPRs); the 13th repeat is truncated. These subunits are dimerized by TPR repeats 6 and 7. OGT is highly expressed in the pancreas and also expressed in the heart, brain, skeletal muscle, and the placenta. There have been trace amounts found in the lung and the liver. The binding sites have been determined for the 110 kDa subunit. It has 3 binding sites at amino acid residues 849, 852, and 935. The probable active site is at residue 508.

The crystal structure of O-GlcNAc transferase has not been well studied, but the structure of a binary complex with UDP and a ternary complex with UDP and a peptide substrate has been researched. The OGT-UDP complex contains three domains in its catalytic region: the amino (N)-terminal domain, the carboxy (C)-terminal domain, and the intervening domain (Int-D). The catalytic region is linked to TPR repeats by a translational helix (H3), which loops from the C-cat domain to the N-cat domain along the upper surface of the catalytic region. The OGT-UDP-peptide complex has a larger space between the TPR domain and the catalytic region than the OGT-UDP complex. The CKII peptide, which contains three serine residues and a threonine residue, binds in this space. In 2021 a 5Å CryoEM analysis revealed the relationship between the catalytic domains and the intact TPR regions confirming the dimer arrangement first seen in the TPR alone X ray structure. This structure supports an ordered sequential bi-bi mechanism that matches the fact that “at saturating peptide concentrations, a competitive inhibition pattern was obtained for UDP with respect to UDP-GlcNAc.”

== Mechanism of catalysis ==
The molecular mechanism of O-linked N-acetylglucosamine transferase has not been extensively studied either, since there is not a confirmed crystal structure of the enzyme. A proposed mechanism by Lazarus et al. is supported by product inhibition patterns of UDP at saturating peptide conditions. This mechanism proceeds with starting materials Uridine diphosphate N-acetylglucosamine, and a peptide chain with a reactive serine or threonine hydroxyl group. The proposed reaction is an ordered sequential bi-bi mechanism.

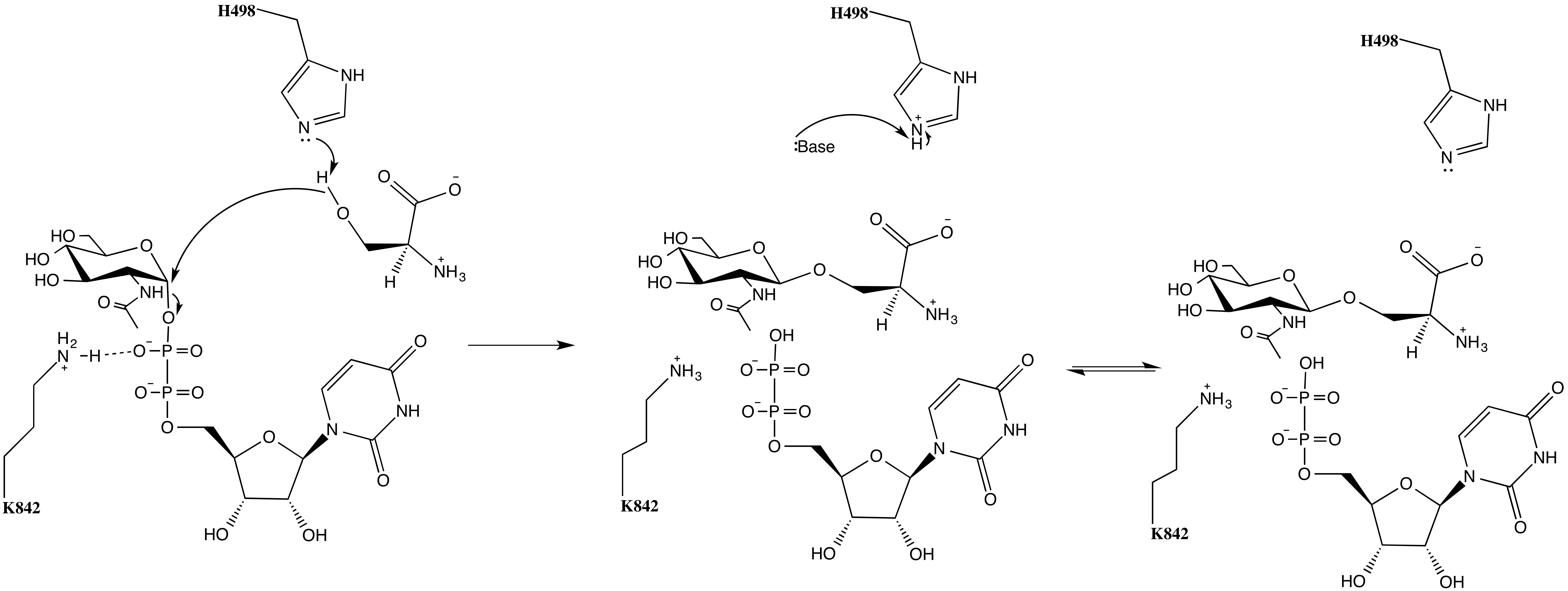
Figure 2: The proposed catalytic mechanism of O-GlcNAc transferase. It is an ordered sequential bi-bi mechanism with only one step, not including a proton transfer. The peptide is represented by a serine residue with a reactive hydroxyl group.

The chemical reaction can be written as:

1. UDP-N-acetyl-D-glucosamine + [protein]-L-serine → UDP + [protein]-3-O-(N-acetyl-D-glucosaminyl)-L-serine
2. UDP-N-acetyl-D-glucosamine + [protein]-L-threonine → UDP + [protein]-3-O-(N-acetyl-D-glucosaminyl)-L-threonine

First, the hydroxyl group of serine is deprotonated by histidine 498, a catalytic base in this proposed reaction. Lysine 842 is also present to stabilize the UDP moiety. The oxygen ion then attacks the sugar-phosphate bond between the glucosamine and UDP. This results in the splitting of UDP-N-acetylglucosamine into N-acetylglucosamine – peptide and UDP. Proton transfers take place at the phosphate and histidine 498. This mechanism is spurred by OGT gene containing O-linked N-acetylglucosamine transferase. Aside from proton transfers the reaction proceeds in one step, as shown in Figure 2. Figure 2 uses a lone serine residue as a representative of the peptide with a reactive hydroxyl group. Threonine could have also been used in the mechanism.

== Inhibitors ==
Many inhibitors of OGT enzymatic activity have been reported. OGT inhibition results in global downregulation of O-GlcNAc. Cells appear to upregulate OGT and downregulate OGA in response to OGT inhibition.

=== 5S-GlcNAc ===
Ac_{4}5S-GlcNAc is converted intracellularly into UDP-5S-GlcNAc, a substrate analogue inhibitor of OGT. UDP-5S-GlcNAc is not efficiently utilized as a donor sugar by OGT, possibly due to distortion of the pyranose ring by replacement of oxygen with sulfur. As other glycosyltransferases utilize UDP-GlcNAc as a donor sugar, UDP-5S-GlcNAc has some non-specific effects on cell-surface glycosylation.

=== OSMI ===
OSMI-1 was first identified from high-throughput screening using fluorescence polarization. Further optimization led to the development of OSMI-2, OSMI-3, and OSMI-4, which bind OGT with low-nanomolar affinity. X-ray crystallography showed that the quinolinone-6-sulfonamide scaffold of OSMI compounds act as a uridine mimetic. OSMI-2, OSMI-3, and OSMI-4 have negatively charged carboxylate groups; esterification renders these inhibitors cell-permeable.

== Regulation ==
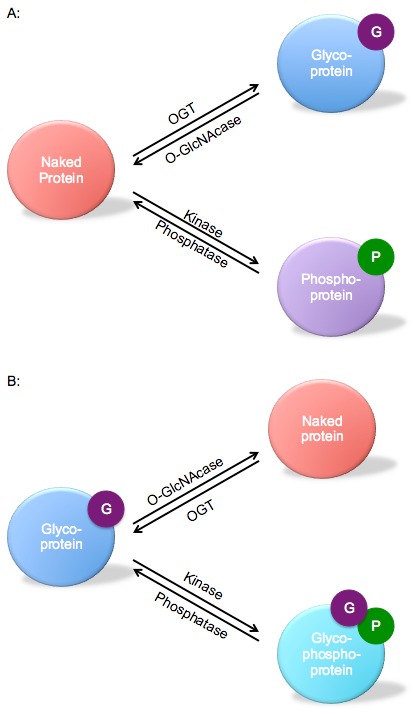
Figure 3: Dynamic Competition between glycosylation and phosphorylation of proteins. A: Competition between OGT and kinase for the serine or threonine functional group of a protein. B: Adjacent-site occupancy where O-GlcNAc and O-phosphatase occur next to each other and can influence the turnover or function of proteins reciprocally. The G circle represents an N-acetylglucosamine group, and the P circle represents a phosphate group. Figure adapted from Hart.

O-GlcNAc transferase is part of a dynamic competition for a serine or threonine hydroxyl functional group in a peptide unit. Figure 3 shows an example of both reciprocal same-site occupancy and adjacent-site occupancy. For the same-site occupancy, OGT competes with kinase to catalyze the glycosylation of the protein instead of phosphorylation. The adjacent-site occupancy example shows the naked protein catalyzed by OGT converted to a glycoprotein, which can increase the turnover of proteins such as the tumor repressor p53.

The post-translational modification of proteins by O-GlcNAc is spurred by glucose flux through the hexosamine biosynthetic pathway. OGT catalyzes attachment of the O-GlcNAc group to serine and threonine, while O-GlcNAcase spurs sugar removal.

This regulation is important for multiple cellular processes including transcription, signal transduction, and proteasomal degradation. Also, there is competitive regulation between OGT and kinase for the protein to attach to a phosphate group or O-GlcNAc, which can alter the function of proteins in the body through downstream effects. OGT inhibits the activity of 6-phosophofructosekinase PFKL by mediating the glycosylation process. This then acts as a part of glycolysis regulation. O-GlcNAc has been defined as a negative transcription regulator in response to steroid hormone signaling.

Studies show that O-GlcNAc transferase interacts directly with the Ten eleven translocation 2 (TET2) enzyme, which converts 5-methylcytosine to 5-hydroxymethylcytosine and regulates gene transcription. Additionally, increasing levels of OGT for O-GlcNAcylation may have therapeutic effects for Alzheimer's disease patients. Brain glucose metabolism is impaired in Alzheimer's disease, and a study suggests that this leads to hyperphosphorylation of tau and degerenation of tau O-GlcNCAcylation. Replenishing tau O-GlcNacylation in the brain along with protein phosphatase could deter this process and improve brain glucose metabolism.

== See also ==
- O-GlcNAc
- O-GlcNAcase (OGA)
- O-linked glycosylation
- EOGT
