= Protein N-acetylglucosaminyltransferase =

Class of enzymes

protein N-acetylglucosaminyltransferase

Identifiers
- EC no.: 2.4.1.94
- CAS no.: 72319-34-7

Databases
- IntEnz: IntEnz view
- BRENDA: BRENDA entry
- ExPASy: NiceZyme view
- KEGG: KEGG entry
- MetaCyc: metabolic pathway
- PRIAM: profile
- PDB structures: RCSB PDB PDBe PDBsum
- Gene Ontology: AmiGO / QuickGO
Search
- PMC: articles
- PubMed: articles
- NCBI: proteins

In enzymology, a protein N-acetylglucosaminyltransferase (EC 2.4.1.94) is an enzyme that catalyzes the chemical reaction

UDP-N-acetyl-D-glucosamine + protein $\rightleftharpoons$ UDP + 4-N-(N-acetyl-D-glucosaminyl)-protein

Thus, the two substrates of this enzyme are UDP-N-acetyl-D-glucosamine and protein, whereas its two products are UDP and 4-N-(N-acetyl-D-glucosaminyl)-protein.

This enzyme belongs to the family of glycosyltransferases, specifically the hexosyltransferases. The systematic name of this enzyme class is UDP-N-acetyl-D-glucosamine:protein beta-N-acetyl-D-glucosaminyl-transferase. Other names in common use include uridine diphosphoacetylglucosamine-protein, acetylglucosaminyltransferase, uridine diphospho-N-acetylglucosamine:polypeptide, beta-N-acetylglucosaminyltransferase, and O-GlcNAc transferase.
