= Finnish heritage disease =

Group of autosomal recessive genetic disorders that affect Finns much more frequently

A Finnish heritage disease is any genetic disease or disorder that is significantly more common in people whose ancestors were ethnic Finns, natives of Finland and Northern Sweden (Torne Valley) and Northwest Russia (Karelia and Ingria). There are 36 rare diseases regarded as Finnish heritage diseases. The diseases are not restricted to Finns; they are genetic diseases with far wider distribution in the world, but due to founder effects and genetic isolation they are more common in Finns.

Within Finland these diseases are more common in the east and north, consistent with their higher association with ethnic Finns than with ethnic Swedes. The Finnish disease heritage does not extend to other ethnic groups in the region, the Sámi and Karelians other than Finnish Karelians. It is attributed to a population bottleneck among ancestors of modern Finns, estimated to have occurred about 4000 years ago, presumably when populations practicing agriculture and animal husbandry arrived in Finland.

In Finland about one in five persons carries a gene defect associated with at least one Finnish heritage disease, and about one in 500 children born is affected. Most of the gene defects are autosomal recessives, so that if both the mother and father carry the same defect, the chance that their child will have the associated disease is 1 in 4. The molecular genetics of many of these diseases have been determined, enabling genetic testing, prenatal testing, and counseling. This has raised questions of bioethics and eugenics.

== Finnish heritage disease types ==
There are 36 identified Finnish heritage diseases:

- Amyloidosis, Finnish type
- Lethal arthrogryposis with anterior horn cell disease
- Aspartylglucosaminuria
- Autoimmune polyendocrinopathy syndrome, type I, with or without reversible metaphyseal dysplasia
- Cartilage–hair hypoplasia
- Ceroid lipofuscinosis, neuronal, 1
- Ceroid lipofuscinosis, neuronal, 3
- Ceroid lipofuscinosis, neuronal, 5
- Ceroid lipofuscinosis, neuronal, 8, Northern epilepsy variant (Synonyms: Northern epilepsy; Epilepsy, progressive, with intellectual disability)
- Choroideremia
- Cohen syndrome
- Cornea plana 2
- Diarrhea 1, secretory chloride, congenital
- Diastrophic dysplasia
- Epilepsy, progressive myoclonic 1A (Unverricht–Lundborg)
- Glycine encephalopathy (Nonketotic hyperglycinemia)
- GRACILE syndrome
- Gyrate atrophy of choroid and retina
- Hydrolethalus syndrome 1
- Infantile-onset spinocerebellar ataxia (Mitochondrial DNA depletion syndrome 7)
- Lactase deficiency, congenital
- Lethal congenital contracture syndrome 1
- Lysinuric protein intolerance
- Meckel syndrome
- Megaloblastic anemia-1, Finnish and Norwegian type
- Mulibrey nanism
- Muscular dystrophy-dystroglycanopathy (congenital with brain and eye anomalies), type A, 3
- Nephrotic syndrome, type 1 (Finnish congenital nephrosis)
- Ovarian dysgenesis 1
- Polycystic lipomembranous osteodysplasia with sclerosing leukoencephalopathy (Nasu–Hakola disease)
- Progressive encephalopathy with Edema, Hypsarrhythmia and Optic atrophy
- RAPADILINO syndrome
- Retinoschisis 1, X-linked, juvenile
- Sialuria, Finnish type (Salla disease)
- Tibial muscular dystrophy, tardive
- Usher syndrome, type 3A

Out of these, three are rare causes of dwarfism: cartilage–hair hypoplasia, diastrophic dysplasia and Mulibrey nanism.

Four genetically distinct subtypes of neuronal ceroid lipofuscinosis are found in the Finnish heritage: CLN1, CLN3, CLN5, and CLN8. Names for conditions associated with these subtypes include infantile neuronal ceroid lipofuscinosis, Jansky–Bielschowsky disease and northern epilepsy syndrome. As of 2001, CLN5 and CLN8 had been reported almost exclusively in Finland.

Meckel syndrome type 1 (MKS1), a lethal condition, is known in 48 Finnish families.

== Other genetic diseases ==
The European Organization for Rare Diseases (EURORDIS) estimates that there are between 5,000 and 7,000 distinct rare diseases, affecting between 6% and 8% of the population of the European Union. The majority of genetic diseases reported in Finland are not part of the Finnish disease heritage and their prevalence is not higher in Finland than worldwide.

Some genetic diseases are disproportionately rare in Finns. These include cystic fibrosis and phenylketonuria. In Finland, about 1 in 80 persons are carriers of a cystic fibrosis mutation, compared with an average of 1 in 25 elsewhere in Europe.

== Genetic history ==
Based on molecular data, a population bottleneck among ancestors of modern Finns is estimated to have occurred about 4000 years ago. This bottleneck resulted in exceptionally low diversity in the Y chromosome, estimated to reflect the survival of just two ancestral male lineages. The distribution of Y chromosome haplotypes within Finland is consistent with two separate founding settlements, in eastern and western Finland. The Finnish disease heritage has been attributed to this 4000-year-old bottleneck. The geographic distribution and family pedigrees associated with some Finnish heritage disease mutations has linked the enrichment in these mutations to multiple local founder effects, some associated with a period of "late settlement" in the 16th century (see History of Finland).

== Etymology ==
Although the concept is older, the English term "Finnish disease heritage" first appears in the medical literature in the 1990s. One of the earliest uses is in the translated title of a 1994 medical article, soon followed by others.

== See also ==
- Leena Peltonen-Palotie
- Nine diseases
- Population genetics
- BCG disease outbreak in Finland in the 2000s
- Medical genetics of Ashkenazi Jews
- Finnish Association on Intellectual and Developmental Disabilities (FAIDD)
- Finno-Ugrian suicide hypothesis
