= CLN =

CLN may refer to:

== Computing and technology ==
- Class Library for Numbers, a free software project
- Computer Learning Network, a technical school (college) in Mechanicsburg, Pennsylvania; see YTI Career Institute
- Controlled natural language, a subset of a natural language that is obtained by restricting its grammar and vocabulary in order to reduce or eliminate ambiguity and complexity.

== Politics and government ==
- Certificate of Loss of Nationality, an American form
- National Liberation Committee (Italian: Comitato di Liberazione Nazionale), the underground political entity of Italian Partisans during the German occupation of Italy

== Other ==
- Catamount Library Network, a library consortium in Vermont
- Chapeltown railway station, in South Yorkshire
- Credit-linked note, a security issued by a special purpose company or trust
- Sri Lanka (Ceylon), ITU country code

== See also ==
- Genes related to neuronal ceroid lipofuscinosis: CLN3, CLN5, CLN6, CLN8
