= Sara Mole =

British microbiologist and researcher

- Born: Sara Elizabeth Mole
- Education: University of Cambridge (BA); Imperial College London (PhD)
- Scientific career
- Fields: Cell biology Batten disease Neuronal ceroid lipofuscinosis
- Workplaces: Imperial College London; University of Cambridge; University College London
- Thesis: A functional and immunochemical analysis of SV40 large T antigen (1986)
- Doctoral advisor: David Lane
- Website: www.ucl.ac.uk/lmcb/users/sara-mole

Sara Elizabeth Mole is a Professor of Molecular Cell Biology and former UCL's Envoy for Gender Equality at University College London and the UCL Great Ormond Street Institute of Child Health. She works on diseases caused by genetic changes, in particular neurodegenerative diseases that impact children.

== Early life and education ==
Mole studied the Natural Sciences Tripos at the University of Cambridge and graduated in 1983. She moved to Imperial College London for her doctoral studies and was awarded a PhD in 1986 for analysis of the SV40 large T antigen.

== Research and career ==
Mole continued to a postdoctoral fellowship at the Imperial Cancer Research Fund, before moving back to the University of Cambridge for a research position. In 1992, Mole was appointed a lecturer in the Department of Paediatrics at University College London. She became a Group Leader in the Medical Research Council Laboratory for molecular cell biology in 2005, later moving to the UCL Great Ormond Street Hospital Institute of Child Health. She investigates the genetic basis of neuronal ceroid lipofuscinosis diseases.

Mole has extensively investigated the lysosomal disease Batten disease, writing a textbook on the subject and setting up a mutation database and on-line resource web site for patients and their families. Batten disease is characterised by the accumulation of autofluorescent material in lysosomes and presents with visual failure, seizures, cognitive impairment and decline in motor abilities.

Mole has contributed to the identification and characterization of thirteen genes that cause Batten disease. Treatments for the majority of these diseases exist only as palliative care. She led a multi-million pound Horizon 2020 research project on Batten disease biology, BATCure, partnering with 14 European institutions and the UK Batten Disease Family Association. BATCure looks to develop new treatments for patients suffering from types of Batten disease without therapeutic development; including CLN3 disease.

Mole uses the model organism Schizosaccharomyces pombe to study CLN3 disease, and found that whilst most young patients with juvenile CLN3 disease neuronal ceroid lipofuscinosis share an intragenic deletion this does not totally abolish function of the CLN3 gene. She showed the some CLN8 disease is caused by large genomic deletions.

In 2013 Mole was awarded the University College London prize for public engagement. In 2018 she was awarded the University College London Provost's Excellence Award for her contribution to gender equality. She serves as Provost's Envoy for Gender Equality, leading the University College London submission to Athena SWAN and leading initiatives to promote equality and inclusion across campus. She led the first successful application for a departmental gold Athena SWAN award at University College London. At University College London, Mole set up a Women in Leadership network and is Chair of the Gender Equality Steering Group.

=== Selected publications ===
Her publications include;

- Mole, Sara (2011). The Neuronal Ceroid Lipofuscinoses. Oxford University Press. doi:10.1093/med/9780199972135.003.0059. ISBN 9780199590018.
- Mole, Sara (1993). "Germ-line mutations of the RET proto-oncogene in multiple endocrine neoplasia type 2A". Nature. 363 (6428): 458–460. Bibcode:1993Natur.363..458M. doi:10.1038/363458a0. PMID 8099202. S2CID 4349714.
- Mole, Sara (1999). "The neuronal ceroid lipofuscinoses in human EPMR and mnd mutant mice are associated with mutations in CLN8". Nature Genetics. 23 (2): 233–236. doi:10.1038/13868. PMID 10508524. S2CID 23920094.
- Mole, Sara (2012). "Strikingly different clinicopathological phenotypes determined by progranulin-mutation dosage". American Journal of Human Genetics. 90 (6): 1102–1107. doi:10.1016/j.ajhg.2012.04.021. PMC 3370276. PMID 22608501.
