= Jansky–Bielschowsky disease =

- Jansky–Bielschowsky disease is inherited in an autosomal recessive manner
- Specialty: Medical genetics

Jansky–Bielschowsky disease is an extremely rare autosomal recessive genetic disorder that is part of the neuronal ceroid lipofuscinosis (NCL) family of neurodegenerative disorders. It is caused by the accumulation of lipopigments in the body due to a deficiency in tripeptidyl peptidase I as a result of a mutation in the TPP1 gene. Symptoms appear between ages 2 and 4 and consist of typical neurodegenerative complications: loss of muscle function (ataxia), drug resistant seizures (epilepsy), apraxia, development of muscle twitches (myoclonus), and vision impairment. This late-infantile form of the disease progresses rapidly once symptoms are onset and ends in death between age 8 and teens. The prevalence of Jansky–Bielschowsky disease is unknown; however, NCL collectively affects an estimated 1 in 100,000 individuals worldwide. Jansky–Bielschowsky disease is related to late-infantile Batten disease and LINCL, and is under the umbrella of neuronal ceroid lipofuscinosis.

== Pathology ==
The majority of cases are a result of mutations in the TPP1 gene; however, mutations in the CLN5, CLN6, CLN8, MFSD8, and PPT1 genes also account for a small number of cases. These mutations result in reduced activity of peptidase enzymes, particularly affecting lysosomes, but other mutations can affect protein catabolism in white blood cells, fibroblasts, and chorionic villi. The reduced function of these enzymes results in insufficient or incomplete breakdown of proteins, consequently resulting in the buildup of lipopigments in the lysosome. Though the accumulation of lipopigments occurs throughout the body, neurons are especially vulnerable to damage by lipopigment aggregation; a ubiquitous accumulation in lipopigments occurs in neurons, primarily concentrated in the cerebral and cerebellar cortices. This accumulation results in atrophy in these regions of the brain, and cause the pathogenesis of signs and symptoms of Jansky–Bielschowsky disease. Currently, it is unclear what mechanism in relation to enzyme activity is responsible for the buildup of lipoproteins.

== Diagnosis ==
Diagnosis of Jansky–Bielschowsky disease is increasingly based on assay of enzyme activity and molecular genetic testing. Thirteen pathogenic candidate genes—PPT1, TPP1, CLN3, CLN5, CLN6, MFSD8, CLN8, CTSD, DNAJC5, CTSF, ATP13A2 GRN, KCTD7—are associated with the development of the disease. Patients with Jansky–Bielschowsky disease typically have up to 50% reduced lysosomal enzymes, and thus an enzyme activity assay is a quick and easy diagnostic test.

Vision impairment is an early symptom of Jansky–Bielschowsky disease, and so an eye exam is another common diagnostic tool. During the eye exam, loss of cells within the eye would indicate the presence of the disease however more tests are needed for a complete diagnosis.

Other common diagnostic tests include:

- Blood or urine test: elevated levels of the chemical dolichol found in the urine is typical of individuals with the disease, as well as the presence of vacuolated lymphocytes in the blood.
- Skin or tissue sampling: microscopy of skin could be used to observe lipopigment aggregation.
- CT scan or MRI: visualization of the brain would be able to detect areas of cerebral atrophy.

== Treatment ==
On April 27, 2017, the U.S. Food and Drug Administration approved Brineura (cerliponase alfa) as the first specific treatment for NCL. Brineura is enzyme replacement therapy manufactured through recombinant DNA technology. The active ingredient in Brineura, cerliponase alpha, is intended to slow loss of walking ability in symptomatic pediatric patients three years of age and older with late infantile neuronal ceroid lipofuscinosis type 2 (CLN2), also known as tripeptidyl peptidase-1 (TPP1) deficiency. Brineura is administered into the cerebrospinal fluid by infusion via a surgically implanted reservoir and catheter in the head (intraventricular access device).

== Eponym ==
It is named for Jan Janský and Max Bielschowsky.
