= Kufs disease =

- Other names: Adult neuronal ceroid lipofuscinosis, ANCL, Adult NCL

Kufs disease is one of many diseases categorized under a disorder known as neuronal ceroid lipofuscinosis (NCLs) or Batten disease. NCLs are broadly described to create problems with vision, movement and cognitive function. Among all NCLs diseases, Kufs is the only one that does not affect vision, and although this is a distinguishing factor of Kufs, NCLs are typically differentiated by the age at which they appear in a patient.

== Signs and symptoms ==
Kufs is a neuronal disease, meaning it affects the nervous system, specifically voluntary movement and intellectual function. Symptoms of Kufs can manifest anytime between adolescence and adulthood; however, it usually appears around age 30. There are two types of Kufs: Type A and Type B. Type A causes seizures, myoclonic epilepsy (muscle jerks), dementia, ataxia (compromised muscle coordination), tremors and tics, dysarthria (speech difficulties), confusion, and psychotic behaviour. Although similar to Type A, patients with Type B do not experience myoclonic epilepsy or dysarthria, and they do display changes in personality. Occasionally, patients present with skin disorders causing dryness, roughness, and scaliness. The skin symptoms are a result of keratin buildup in the skin cells (see Genetics for more information). Regardless of the type, most Kufs patients do not survive more than 15 years after their symptoms manifest.

== Genetics ==
Type A and Type B Kufs disease are caused by mutations in two sets of different genes. Both gene sets are responsible for producing proteins and enzymes that are heavily involved in protein degradation and excretion in the cell – specifically, the nerve cell.

=== Type A ===
Mutations to the CLN6 and PPT1 genes result in Kufs disease Type A. CLN6 produces proteins that facilitate fat transport throughout a cell, as well as excretion out of the cell. The PPT1 gene codes for the enzyme palmotoyl-protein thioesterase-1. This enzyme is responsible for removing the fatty-acid side chains off of proteins that have been translocated into the lysosome. By removing the surrounding fats, palmotoyl-protein thioesterase-1 creates easier access for other enzymes to break down the rest of the protein. Fatty substance build up in the brain is a consequence of the mutated genes. The fats and proteins that build up are called lipopigments. Eventually the buildup of lipopigments results in death of the neuron cells, giving way to the phenotypic symptoms. Type A is an autosomal recessive disease, indicating that it is inherited from the parents. Each parent must carry one copy of the mutation; however, the recessive designation indicates that with only one copy, the parents are not affected, and do not show any symptoms.

=== Type B ===
Kufs disease Type B is caused by mutations to the DNAJC5 and CTSF genes. This form of Kufs is autosomal dominant, meaning that only one copy of each mutated gene is enough for the disease to manifest. When there is a mutation in the DNAJC5 gene, it affects the production of a cysteine string protein (CSP) that is coded within DNAJC5. CSP aids in transmitting signals through the nerves found in the brain. When the CTSF gene is mutated, it cannot produce Cathepsin F, an enzyme that cuts proteins in the lysosome. By cutting proteins, Cathepsin F can modify the function of the proteins as well as help break them down. Similar to Type A, when both DNAJC5 and CTSF are non-functional, it results in the incomplete breakdown of proteins. Once again, lipopigments build up and brain function is decreased as the neuron cells die.

== Diagnosis ==
Diagnosis is usually done by performing genetic analysis (e.g. sequencing, genotyping) when there is reason to suspect Kufs disease. Clinicians may order such tests when the common phenotypes of Kufs disease are observed in patients in order to confirm the diagnosis.

== Treatment ==
Kufs disease is managed through supportive care.
