= Cln3 (disambiguation) =

Cln3 may refer to:

- CLN3 (human): Battenin, a human lysosomal protein associated with Batten disease.
- Cln3 (yeast): The Saccharomyces cerevisiae G1 cyclin Cln3, a primary regulator of cell cycle entry.
