= ANCL =

ANCL may refer to:

- The Ante-Nicene Christian Library, a collection of early Christian writings in English translation
- Adult NCL (neuronal ceroid lipofuscinosis) or Kufs disease, a disease of the nervous system
- Associated Newspapers of Ceylon Limited or Lake House, a publisher of newspapers in Sri Lanka

== See also ==
- Anacyclus clavatus or white buttons, a flowering plant whose symbol in the USDA plant database is ANCL2
