= Neuronal ceroid lipofuscinosis =

- Other names: NCL
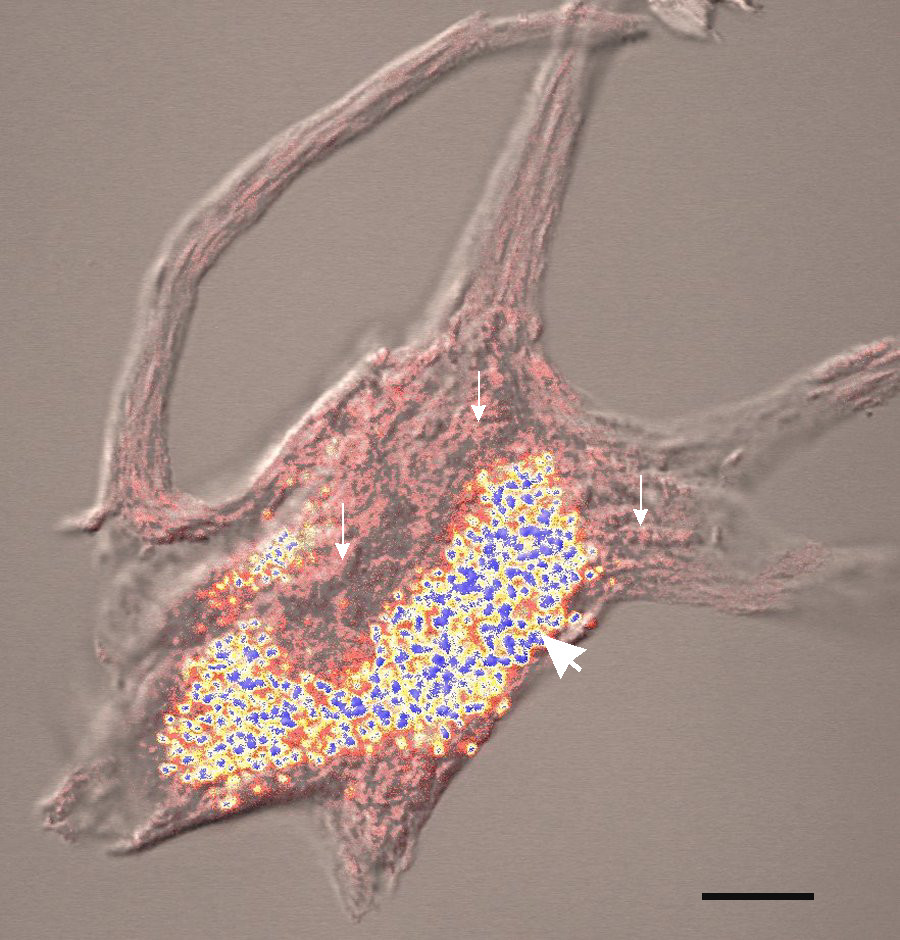
- Confocal image of a spinal motor neuron showing stained lipofuscin granules in blue and yellow.
- Specialty: Endocrinology

Neuronal ceroid lipofuscinosis is a family of at least eight genetically separate neurodegenerative lysosomal storage diseases that result from excessive accumulation of lipopigments (lipofuscin) in the body's tissues. These lipopigments are made up of fats and proteins. Their name comes from the word stem "lipo-", which is a variation on lipid, and from the term "pigment", used because the substances take on a greenish-yellow color when viewed under an ultraviolet light microscope. These lipofuscin materials build up in neuronal cells and many organs, including the liver, spleen, myocardium, and kidneys.

== Signs and symptoms ==
The classic characterization of the group of neurodegenerative, lysosomal storage disorders called the neuronal ceroid lipofuscinoses (NCLs) is through the progressive, permanent loss of motor and psychological ability with a severe intracellular accumulation of lipofuscins, with the United States and Northern European populations having slightly higher frequency with an occurrence of one in 10,000. Four classic diagnoses have received the most attention from researchers and the medical field, differentiated from one another by age of symptomatic onset, duration, early-onset manifestations such as blindness or seizures, and the forms which lipofuscin accumulation takes.

In the early infantile variant of NCL (also called INCL or Santavuori-Haltia), probands appear normal at birth, but early visual loss leading to complete retinal blindness by the age of 2 years is the first indicator of the disease; by 3 years of age, a vegetative state is reached, and by 4 years, isoelectric encephalograms confirm brain death. Late infantile variant usually manifests between 2 and 4 years of age with seizures and deterioration of vision. The maximum age before death for late infantile variant is 10–12 years. Juvenile NCL (JNCL, Batten disease, or Spielmeyer-Vogt), with a prevalence of one in 100,000, usually arises between 4 and 10 years of age; the first symptoms include considerable vision loss due to retinal dystrophy, with seizures, psychological degeneration, and eventual death in the mid- to late 20s or 30s ensuing. Adult variant NCL (ANCL or Kuf's disease) is less understood and generally manifests milder symptoms; however, while symptoms typically appear around 30 years of age, death usually occurs 10 years later.

All the mutations that have been associated with this disease have been linked to genes involved with the neural synapses metabolism – most commonly with the reuse of vesicle proteins.

== Genetics ==
Childhood NCLs are generally autosomal recessive disorders; that is, they occur only when a child inherits two copies of the defective gene, one from each parent. When both parents carry one defective gene, each of their children faces a one in four chance of developing NCL. At the same time, each child also faces a one in two chance of inheriting just one copy of the defective gene. Individuals who have only one defective gene are known as carriers, meaning they do not develop the disease, but they can pass the gene on to their own children. The most commonly identified mutations are in the CLN3 gene, which is located on the short arm of chromosome 16 (16p12.1). The normal function of the gene is not presently known, but results in a transmembrane protein.

Adult NCL may be inherited as an autosomal recessive (Kufs), or less often, as an autosomal dominant (Parry's) disorder. In autosomal dominant inheritance, all people who inherit a single copy of the disease gene develop the disease. As a result, no carriers of the gene are unaffected.

Many authorities refer to the NCLs collectively as Batten disease.

== Diagnosis ==
Because vision loss is often an early sign, NCL may be first suspected during an eye exam. An eye doctor can detect a loss of cells within the eye that occurs in the three childhood forms of NCL. However, because such cell loss occurs in other eye diseases, the disorder cannot be diagnosed by this sign alone. Often, an eye specialist or other physician who suspects NCL may refer the child to a neurologist, a doctor who specializes in disease of the brain and nervous system. To diagnose NCL, the neurologist needs the patient's medical history and information from various laboratory tests.

Diagnostic tests used for NCLs include:

- Skin or tissue sampling: The doctor can examine a small piece of tissue under a microscope to spot typical NCL deposits. These deposits are found in many different tissues, including skin, muscle, conjunctiva, rectal and others. Blood can also be used. These deposits take on characteristic shapes, depending on the variant under which they are said to occur: granular osmophilic deposits (GRODs) are generally characteristic of INCL, while curvilinear profiles, fingerprint profiles, and mixed-type inclusions are typically found in LINCL, JNCL, and ANCL, respectively.
- Electroencephalogram or EEG: An EEG uses special patches placed on the scalp to record electrical currents inside the brain. This helps doctors see telltale patterns in the brain's electrical activity that suggest a patient has seizures.
- Electrical studies of the eyes: These tests, which include visual-evoked responses and electroretinograms, can detect various eye problems common in childhood NCLs.
- Brain scans: Imaging can help doctors look for changes in the brain's appearance. The most commonly used imaging technique is computed tomography (CT), which uses x-rays and a computer to create a sophisticated picture of the brain's tissues and structures. A CT scan may reveal brain areas that are decaying in NCL patients. An increasingly common tool is magnetic resonance imaging, which uses a combination of magnetic fields and radio waves, instead of radiation, to create a picture of the brain.
- Enzyme assay: A recent development in diagnosis of NCL is the use of enzyme assays that look for specific missing lysosomal enzymes for infantile and late infantile versions only. This is a quick and easy diagnostic test.

=== Types ===
The older classification of NCL divided the condition into four types (CLN1, CLN2, CLN3, and CLN4) based upon age of onset, while newer classifications divide it by the associated gene.

CLN4 (unlike CLN1, CLN2, and CLN3) has not been mapped to a specific gene.

Type	Description	OMIM	Gene
Type 1	Infantile NCL (Santavuori–Haltia disease, INCL): begins between about 6 months and 2 years of age and progresses rapidly. Affected children fail to thrive and have abnormally small heads (microcephaly). Also typical are short, sharp muscle contractions called myoclonic jerks. Initial signs of this disorder include delayed psychomotor development with progressive deterioration, other motor disorders, or seizures. The infantile form has the most rapid progression and children live into their mid-childhood years. The gene responsible for infantile NCL has been identified in some cases of juvenile/adult onset. These patients are thought to have some partial enzyme production that leads to a protracted, less severe disease course.	256730	PPT1
Type 2	Late infantile NCL (Jansky–Bielschowsky disease, LINCL) begins between ages 2 and 4. The typical early signs are loss of muscle coordination (ataxia) and seizures, along with progressive mental deterioration, though affected children may show mild to severe delays in speech development well before other symptoms appear. This form progresses rapidly and ends in death between ages 8 and 12.	204500	TPP1
Type 3	Juvenile NCL (Batten disease, JNCL) begins between the ages of 5 and 8 years of age. The typical early signs are progressive vision loss, seizures, ataxia, or clumsiness. This form progresses less rapidly and ends in death in the late teens or early 20s, although some have been known to live into their 30s.	204200	CLN3
Type 4	Adult NCL (Kufs disease, ANCL) generally begins before the age of 40, causes milder symptoms that progress slowly, and does not cause blindness. Although age of death is variable among affected individuals, this form does shorten life expectancy.	204300 (AR), 162350 (AD)	CLN6 DNAJC5
Type 5	Finnish late infantile (Finnish late infantile variant, vLINCL) – identified in Finland	256731	CLN5
Type 6	Variant late infantile (late infantile variant, vLINCL) – identified in Costa Rica, South America, Portugal, the United Kingdom and other nations	601780	CLN6
Type 7	CLN7	610951	MFSD8
Type 8	CLN8 Northern epilepsy, progressive epilepsy with mental retardation (EPMR)	610003	CLN8
Type 8	Turkish late infantile (Turkish late infantile variant, vLINCL) – identified in Turkey	600143	CLN8
Type 9	Identified in Germany and Serbia	609055	Unknown, but possibly regulator of dihydroceramide synthase
Type 10	CLN10 (congenital, cathepsin D deficiency)	116840	CTSD

=== Mutations ===
==== Infantile form ====
Mannose-6-phosphate

Nonsense and frameshift mutations in the CLN1 gene (located at 1p32) always induce classical INCL, while some missense mutations have been associated with ANCL in addition to the infantile and juvenile forms. The mutation typically results in a deficient form of a lysosomal enzyme called palmitoyl protein thioesterase 1 (PPT1).

The wild-type PPT1 is a 306-amino acid polypeptide that is typically targeted for transport into lysosomes by the mannose 6-phosphate (M6P) receptor-mediated pathway. Here, the protein appears to function in removing palmitate residues by cleaving thioester linkages in s-acylated (or palmitoylated) proteins, encouraging their breakdown. Defective polypeptides, however, are unable to exit the endoplasmic reticulum (ER), most likely due to misfolding; further analyses of this pathway could serve to categorize INCL among lysosomal enzyme deficiencies. The human PPT gene shows 91% similarity to bovine PPT and 85% similarity to rat PPT; these data indicate that the PPT gene is highly conserved and likely plays a vital role in cell metabolism. In addition, buildup of defective PPT1 in the ER has been shown to cause the increased release of Ca2+. This homeostasis-altering event leads to increased mitochondrial membrane permeability and subsequent activation of caspase-9, eventually leading to an accumulation of cleft and uncleft poly(ADP-ribose) polymerase and eventual apoptosis.

==== Late infantile form ====
The CLN2 gene encodes a 46kDa protein called lysosomal tripeptidyl peptidase I (TPP1), which cleaves tripeptides from terminal amine groups of partially unfolded proteins. Mutations of this gene typically result in a LINCL phenotype.

On April 27, 2017, the U.S. Food and Drug Administration approved cerliponase alfa (Brineura) as the first specific treatment for NCL. It is enzyme replacement therapy manufactured through recombinant DNA technology. The active ingredient in Brineura, cerliponase alfa, is intended to slow loss of walking ability in symptomatic pediatric patients 3 years of age and older with late infantile neuronal ceroid lipofuscinosis type 2 (CLN2), also known as TPP1 deficiency. Brineura is administered into the cerebrospinal fluid by infusion via a surgically implanted reservoir and catheter in the head (intraventricular access device).

==== Juvenile form ====
All mutations resulting in the juvenile variant of NCL have been shown to occur at the CLN3 gene on 16p12; of the mutations known to cause JNCL, 85% result from a 1.02-kb deletion, with a loss of amino acids 154–438, while the remaining 15% appear to result from either point or frameshift mutations. The wild-type CLN3 gene codes for a protein with no known function, but studies of the yeast CLN3 ortholog, the product of which is called battenin (after its apparent connections to Batten's disease, or JNCL), have suggested that the protein may play a role in lysosomal pH homeostasis. Furthermore, recent studies have also implied the protein's role in cathepsin D deficiency; the overexpression of the defective protein appears to have significant effects on cathepsin D processing, with implications suggesting that accumulation of ATP synthase subunit C would result. Only recently have studies of human patients shown deficiency of lysosomal aspartyl proteinase cathepsin D.

==== Adult dominant form ====
Between 1.3 and 10% of cases are of the adult form. The age at onset is variable (6–62 yr). Two main clinical subtypes have been described: progressive myoclonus epilepsy (type A) and dementia with motor disturbances, such as cerebellar, extrapyramidal signs and dyskinesia (type B). Unlike the other NCLs, retinal degeneration is absent. Pathologically, the ceroid-lipofuscin accumulates mainly in neurons and contains subunit C of the mitochondrial ATP synthase.

Two independent families have been shown to have mutations in the DNAJC5 gene – one with a transversion and the other with a deletion mutation. The mutations occur in a cysteine-string domain, which is required for membrane targeting/binding, palmitoylation, and oligomerization of the encoded protein cysteine-string protein alpha (CSPα). The mutations dramatically decrease the affinity of CSPα for the membrane. A second report has also located this disease to this gene.

== Treatment ==
Currently, no widely accepted treatment can cure, slow down, or halt the symptoms in the great majority of patients with NCL, but seizures may be controlled or reduced with use of antiepileptic drugs. Additionally, physical, speech, and occupational therapies may help affected patients retain functioning for as long as possible. Several experimental treatments are under investigation.

=== Cystagon ===
In 2001, a drug used to treat cystinosis, a rare genetic disease that can cause kidney failure if not treated, was reported to be useful in treating the infantile form of NCL. Preliminary results report the drug has completely cleared away storage material from the white blood cells of the first six patients, as well as slowing down the rapid neurodegeneration of infantile NCL. Currently, two drug trials are underway for infantile NCL, both using Cystagon.

=== Gene therapy ===
A gene therapy trial using an adenoassociated virus vector called AAV2CUhCLN2 began in June 2004 in an attempt to treat the manifestations of late infantile NCL. The trial was conducted by Weill Medical College of Cornell University and sponsored by the Nathan's Battle Foundation. In May 2008, the gene therapy given to the recipients reportedly was "safe, and that, on average, it significantly slowed the disease's progression during the 18-month follow-up period" and "suggested that higher doses and a better delivery system may provide greater benefit".

A second gene therapy trial for late infantile NCL using an adenoassociated virus derived from the rhesus macaque (a species of Old World monkey) called AAVrh.10 began in August 2010, and is once again being conducted by Weill Medical College of Cornell University. Animal models of late infantile NCL showed that the AAVrh.10 delivery system "was much more effective, giving better spread of the gene product and improving survival greatly".

A third gene therapy trial, using the same AAVrh.10 delivery system, began in 2011 and has been expanded to include late infantile NCL patients with moderate to severe impairment or uncommon genotypes, and uses a novel administration method that reduces general anesthesia time by 50% to minimize potential adverse side effects.

=== Flupirtine ===
Flupirtine

A painkiller available in several European countries, flupirtine, has been suggested to possibly slow down the progress of NCL, particularly in the juvenile and late infantile forms. No trial has been officially supported in this venue, however. Currently, the drug is available to NCL families either from Germany, Duke University Medical Center in Durham, North Carolina, or the Hospital for Sick Children in Toronto.

=== Stem cells ===
On October 20, 2005, the Food and Drug Administration approved a phase-I clinical trial of neural stem cells to treat infantile and late infantile Batten disease. Subsequent approval from an independent review board also approved the stem cell therapy in early March 2006. This treatment will be the first transplant of fetal stem cells performed on humans. The therapy is being developed by Stem Cells Inc and is estimated to have six patients. The treatment was to be carried out in Oregon.

Juvenile NCL has recently been listed on the Federal Clinical Trials website to test the effectiveness of bone-marrow or stem-cell transplants for this condition. A bone-marrow transplant has been attempted in the late infantile form of NCL with disappointing results; while the transplant may have slowed the onset of the disease, the child eventually developed the disease and died in 1998.

Trials testing the effectiveness of bone-marrow transplants for infantile NCL in Finland have also been disappointing, with only a slight slowing of disease reported.

=== Immunosuppressants ===
In late 2007, Dr. David Pearce et al. reported that Cellcept, an immunosuppressant medication commonly used in bone-marrow transplants, may be useful in slowing down the progress of juvenile NCL.

=== Enzyme replacement therapy ===
On April 27, 2017, the U.S. FDA approved cerliponase alfa as the first specific treatment for NCL.

== Epidemiology ==
Incidence can vary greatly from type-to-type, and from country-to-country.

In Germany, one study reported an incidence of 1.28 per 100,000.

A study in Italy reported an incidence of 0.56 per 100,000.

A study in Norway reported an incidence of 3.9 per 100,000 using the years from 1978 to 1999, with a lower rate in earlier decades.

== History ==
=== 19th century ===
The first probable instances of this condition were reported in 1826 in a Norwegian medical journal by Dr. Christian Stengel, who described 4 affected siblings in a small mining community in Norway. Although no pathological studies were performed on these children the clinical descriptions are so succinct that the diagnosis of the Spielmeyer-Sjogren (juvenile) type is fully justified.

=== 1900 to 1950 ===
More fundamental observations were reported by F. E. Batten in 1903, and by Heinrich Vogt in 1905, who performed extensive clinicopathological studies on several families. Retrospectively, these papers disclose that the authors grouped together different types of the syndrome. Furthermore, Batten, at least for some time, insisted that the condition that he described was distinctly different from Tay–Sachs disease, the prototype of a neuronal lysosomal disorder now identified as GM2 gangliosidosis type A. Around the same time, Walther Spielmeyer reported detailed studies on three siblings, who have the Spielmeyer-Sjogren (juvenile) type, which led him to the very firm statement that this malady is not related to Tay–Sachs disease. Subsequently, however, the pathomorphological studies of Károly Schaffer made these authors change their minds to the extent that they reclassified their respective observations as variants of Tay–Sachs disease, which caused confusion lasting about 50 years.

In 1913–14, Max Bielschowsky delineated the late infantile form of NCL. However, all forms were still thought to belong in the group of "familial amaurotic idiocies", of which Tay–Sachs was the prototype.

In 1931, Torsten Sjögren, a Swedish psychiatrist and geneticist, presented 115 cases with extensive clinical and genetic documentation and came to the conclusion that the disease now called the Spielmeyer-Sjogren (juvenile) type is genetically separate from Tay–Sachs.

=== 1950 to today ===
Departing from the careful morphological observations of Spielmeyer, Hurst, and Sjovall and Ericsson, Zeman and Alpert made a determined effort to document the previously suggested pigmentary nature of the neuronal deposits in certain types of storage disorders. Simultaneously, Terry and Korey and Svennerholm demonstrated a specific ultrastructure and biochemistry for Tay–Sachs disease, and these developments led to the distinct identification and also separation of the NCLs from Tay–Sachs disease by Zeman and Donahue. At that time, it was proposed that the late-infantile (Jansky–Bielschowsky), the juvenile (Spielmeyer–Vogt), and the adult form (Kufs) were quite different from Tay–Sachs disease with respect to chemical pathology and ultrastructure and also different from other forms of sphingolipidoses.

Subsequently, Santavuori and Haltia showed that an infantile form of NCL exists, which Zeman and Dyken had included with the Jansky Bielschowsky type.
