= BDFA =

BDFA may refer to:

- Bangalore District Football Association, India
- Batten Disease Family Association, UK charity
