= Stephanie Hughes =

New Zealand neurobiologist

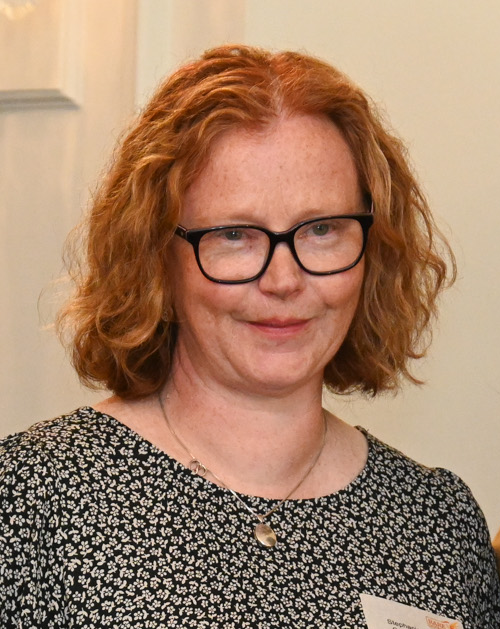
- Hughes in 2025
- Education: Victoria University of Wellington
- Scientific career
- Fields: Molecular neurobiology
- Workplaces: University of Otago
- Thesis: Molecular pathology of subunit c storage in neuronal ceroid lipofuscinoses (1999)
- Doctoral advisor: Thomas William (Bill) Jordan

Stephanie Margaret Hughes is a New Zealand molecular neurobiologist, and is a full professor at the University of Otago, specialising in gene therapy for the fatal childhood disorders known as Batten disease.

== Academic career ==
Hughes grew up in Wellington, and is from a family with a four-generation history of land surveying. Hughes attended Victoria University of Wellington, where she first intended to study maths and statistics, but took an honours degree in genetics and molecular biology instead. Hughes completed a PhD titled Molecular pathology of subunit c storage in neuronal ceroid lipofuscinoses at Victoria University of Wellington, supervised by Bill Jordan. Jordan introduced Hughes to Batten disease, which is a group of fatal inherited childhood neurological degenerative disorders. Hughes began studying Batten disease in the livers of a sheep model developed by Bob Jolly. During her studies, Hughes realised she would need to grow sheep brain cells in laboratory culture, and travelled to the UK for training in the technique. Hughes then began looking at gene therapy during her postdoctoral work at the University of Iowa, learning how to make viral vectors and conduct gene therapy in a mouse model. Hughes worked at the University of Auckland for several years before joining Otago in 2008 as a research group leader. She was promoted to associate professor in 2019 and full professor in 2023. As of 2024 Hughes is the Director of the Brain Health Research Centre at Otago.

Hughes's research focuses on the neurobiology of Batten disease. Hughes and her research group developed a gene therapy for one form of the disease, CLN5, which has progressed to clinical trials in humans. Hughes's laboratory also developed human induced pluripotent stem cells which are better models than animal cells, and can be used to study other disorders, such as Alzheimer's disease.

Hughes has received research funding from the Marsden fund, the Health Research Council, the Neurological Foundation and Cure Kids.

== Selected works ==
- Klionsky, Daniel; Abdelaziz, Amal; Abdelfatah, Sara; et al. (2021). "Guidelines for the use and interpretation of assays for monitoring autophagy (4th edition)". Autophagy. 17 (1): 1–382. doi:10.1080/15548627.2020.1797280. PMC 7996087. PMID 33634751. Wikidata Q110176737.
- Jarvis, Reagan M; Hughes, Stephanie Margaret; Ledgerwood, Elizabeth (2012). "Peroxiredoxin 1 functions as a signal peroxidase to receive, transduce, and transmit peroxide signals in mammalian cells". Free Radical Biology and Medicine. 53 (7): 1522–1530. doi:10.1016/j.freeradbiomed.2012.08.001. PMID 22902630. Wikidata Q39295382.
- Brooks, Andrew; Stein, Colleen; Hughes, Stephanie Margaret; et al. (2002). "Functional correction of established central nervous system deficits in an animal model of lysosomal storage disease with feline immunodeficiency virus-based vectors". Proceedings of the National Academy of Sciences of the United States of America. 99 (9): 6216–6221. Bibcode:2002PNAS...99.6216B. doi:10.1073/pnas.082011999. PMC 122929. PMID 11959904. Wikidata Q34028579.
- Alisky, J M; Hughes, Stephanie Margaret; Sauter, S L; Jolly, D; Dubensky, T W; Staber, P D; Chiorini, J A; Davidson, B L (2000). "Transduction of murine cerebellar neurons with recombinant FIV and AAV5 vectors". NeuroReport. 11 (12): 2669–2673. doi:10.1097/00001756-200008210-00013. PMID 10976941. Wikidata Q74285552.
- Oswald, Manfred; Tantirigama, Malinda; Sonntag, Ivo; Hughes, Stephanie Margaret; Empson, Ruth (2013). "Diversity of layer 5 projection neurons in the mouse motor cortex". Frontiers in Cellular Neuroscience. 7: 174. doi:10.3389/fncel.2013.00174. PMC 3797544. PMID 24137110. Wikidata Q42678498.
- Vazey, Elena; Chen, Kevin; Hughes, Stephanie Margaret; Connor, Bronwen (2006). "Transplanted adult neural progenitor cells survive, differentiate and reduce motor function impairment in a rodent model of Huntington's disease". Experimental Neurology. 199 (2): 384–396. doi:10.1016/j.expneurol.2006.01.034. PMID 16626705. Wikidata Q45300810.
- Hughes, Stephanie Margaret; Moussavi-Harami, Farid; Sauter, Sybille L; Davidson, Beverly (2002). "Viral-mediated gene transfer to mouse primary neural progenitor cells". Molecular Therapy. 5 (1): 16–24. doi:10.1006/mthe.2001.0512. PMID 11786041. Wikidata Q45882544.
