= HYLS1 =

Protein-coding gene in the species Homo sapiens

Identifiers
- Aliases: HYLS1, HLS, centriolar and ciliogenesis associated, HYLS1 centriolar and ciliogenesis associated
- External IDs: OMIM: 610693; MGI: 1924082; HomoloGene: 82283; GeneCards: HYLS1; OMA:HYLS1 - orthologs

Gene location (Human)
Chr.	Chromosome 11 (human)
Band	11q24.2	Start	125,883,614 bp
Band	11q24.2	End	125,900,646 bp

Gene location (Mouse)
Chr.	Chromosome 9 (mouse)
Band	9|9 A4	Start	35,472,116 bp
Band	9|9 A4	End	35,481,694 bp
RNA expression pattern
Bgee	Human / Mouse (ortholog); Top expressed in: oocyte; secondary oocyte; sperm; gonad; testicle; right testis; left testis; ventricular zone; mucosa of ileum; ganglionic eminence / Top expressed in: spermatocyte; seminiferous tubule; zygote; spermatid; secondary oocyte; hand; genital tubercle; ventricular zone; tail of embryo; primary oocyte; More reference expression data
BioGPS	n/a
Gene ontology
Molecular function	protein binding
Cellular component	cytoplasm; nucleus; centrosome; plasma membrane; cytosol; centriole; cytoskeleton; cilium; cell projection; non-motile cilium; microtubule organizing center
Biological process	cilium assembly; cell projection organization
Sources:Amigo / QuickGO
Orthologs
Species	Human	Mouse
Entrez	219844	76832
Ensembl	ENSG00000198331	ENSMUSG00000050555
UniProt	Q96M11	Q9CXX0
RefSeq (mRNA)	NM_001134793; NM_145014; NM_001377269; NM_001377270	NM_029762
RefSeq (protein)	NP_001128265; NP_659451; NP_001364198; NP_001364199	NP_084038
Location (UCSC)	Chr 11: 125.88 – 125.9 Mb	Chr 9: 35.47 – 35.48 Mb
PubMed search
- Wikidata
View/Edit Human	View/Edit Mouse

Hydrolethalus syndrome protein 1 is a protein that in humans is encoded by the HYLS1 gene.

== Function ==
Hyls1 is incorporated into centrioles as they are formed but is not required for centriole assembly. However Hyls1 is required for the formation of cilia.

== Clinical significance ==
Mutations in this gene are associated with hydrolethalus syndrome.
