= Hydrolethalus syndrome =

- Other names: Salonen-Herva-Norio syndrome
- Hydrolethalus syndrome is inherited in an autosomal recessive manner
- Specialty: Medical genetics

Hydrolethalus syndrome (HLS) is a rare genetic disorder that causes improper fetal development, resulting in birth defects and, most commonly, stillbirth.

HLS is associated with HYLS1 mutations. The gene encoding HYLS1 is responsible for proper cilial development within the human body. Cilia are microscopic projections that allow sensory input and signalling output within cells, as well as cell motility. Dysfunction results in a range of abnormalities that are often the result of improper cell signalling. A variant form, HLS2, with additional mutations to the KIF7 gene, is less common. KIF7 also ensures correct cilia formation and function, specifically cilia stability and length.

Hydrolethalus syndrome (HLS) was first mistakenly identified in Finland, during a study on Meckel syndrome. Like HLS, Meckel syndrome presents with severe physiological abnormalities, namely disruptions to the central nervous system and the presence of extra fingers or toes (polydactyly). HLS can be distinguished from Meckel syndrome by analysing kidney function, which is dysfunctional in Meckel syndrome as a result of cyst formation.

== Signs and symptoms ==
HLS presents itself as various, lethal developmental abnormalities, which often result in either premature stillbirth or death shortly after birth. Rare cases of children born with HLS surviving for several months have been noted. A characteristic abnormality of HLS is an absence of brain tissue and midline structures, with the presence of excess brain fluid (hydrocephalus) as a result of abnormal development of the central nervous system. Other common defects include incomplete lung development, heart defects, a cleft lip or palate, polydactyly, and an abnormally small jaw. Stillbirth and an excess of amniotic fluid (polyhydramnios) are common during pregnancy with a HLS-affected foetus, with cases of up to 8 litres cited compared to the normal 1 litre. Less common symptoms such as abnormally small eyes and a broad nose are also possible.

== Cause ==
=== Genetic ===
HLS is caused by a genetic missense mutation of the HYLS1 gene, encoding for Hydrolethalus syndrome protein 1, on chromosome 11; a single base change to the amino acid sequence for HYLS1 in exon 6 involves the replacement of aspartic acid 211 with glycine (D211G) in the polypeptide chain. Exon 6 is the only protein coding exon in HYLS1; proper functioning of exons 1-5 ensures regulation and expression of the entire protein. HLS is an autosomal recessive syndrome; development is only possible if both parents carry the defective gene, and in that instance, the risk of the foetus developing the syndrome is 25%. HLS is a member of the Finnish disease heritage, with incidences more common in Finland than the rest of the world; roughly 1 in 20,000 developing foetuses are affected in Finland. Rare cases in other regions have also been documented, often with less severe phenotypes as a result of allele variability across countries, allowing survival of affected offspring for up to several months. Individuals of Finnish descent are advised to undergo genetic testing before attempting to conceive.

Prior to the discovery of HLS, the HYLS1 gene was unknown, and similar genes within humans have not been identified. Orthologs, genes in other species with common ancestral heritage, have been examined to explain the pathophysiology of HLS; a similar gene within the roundworm, Caenorhabditis elegans, is responsible for the formation of cilia. Current hypotheses place a dysfunction of cilia as the main cause of HLS defects arising from the HYLS1 mutation in humans. Differences between wild type and mutant HYLS1 have been clearly observed; the wild type form is localised to the cytoplasm, while the mutant form is localised to the nucleus and forms small clusters, suggesting that the mutant gene disrupts cellular localisation. The protein encoded by the HYLS1 mutant form is unable to carry out essential targeting of centrioles to the plasma membrane, disrupting ciliary function, which results in ciliopathy. As cilia are located in almost all cells throughout the body, cilial dysfunction causes developmental defects in a range of organs and thus the phenotype of HLS can vary greatly, though brain malformation and polydactyly are most commonly observed.

=== Environmental ===
Currently, no environmental factors are known to increase the likelihood of HLS development or progression; HLS is caused only by genetic abnormalities.

== Pathophysiology ==
The pathophysiology of HLS is abnormal cilia development arising from the inability of the mutated HYLS1 gene to correctly target centrioles to the plasma membrane. Specifically, transition fibres within the transition zone, at the base of the axoneme and adjoining to the plasma membrane, lack proper development. As these structures form the cilial gate, improper development results in a loss of selectivity for protein entry into the ciliary compartment.

=== Variations and related pathologies ===
Mutations in KIF7 have also been noted in patients that present a similar phenotype to HLS and the characteristic HYLS1 A to G transformation; homozygous deletion of the KIF7 gene causes a variant form of HLS, HLS2. KIF7 encodes a structural factor vital to cilial transport, and is also implicated in other developmental disorders, such as Joubert syndrome (JS). Additionally, mutations in HYLS1 are no longer explicitly connected to HLS in humans. Homozygous mutations removing the stop codon in exon 4 of HYLS1 result in a different genomic sequence disruption to the missense mutation of HLS, and phenotypically present as JS. The 'molar tooth sign' of the brain, an anomaly in which cerebellar volume is reduced but cerebellar shape is retained, resembles the molar tooth and is used to identify JS. JS presents with mutations in more than 30 genes, whilst the HYLS1 mutation is the sole cause of HLS, but is also present in the HLS2 variant form with the mutated KIF7 gene.

== Diagnosis ==
HLS can be readily diagnosed during pregnancy through the use of ultrasound, which will often reveal hydrocephaly and an abnormal structure of the brain. Precise examination via ultrasound or at birth is necessary to rule out Meckel syndrome, Trisomy 13, or Smith–Lemli–Opitz syndrome, which present with similar physiological defects. HLS can be detected at the end of the first trimester, approximately 13 weeks gestation.

== Treatment ==
No cure or treatment option for individuals with HLS currently exist. Due to the severity of the foetal defects and the poor prognosis for those with HLS, the pregnancy is often terminated. Certain prevention can only be achieved by avoiding conception if genetic testing indicates both prospective parents as carriers of the defective HYLS1 gene.

== See also ==
•HYLS1
