= David Lane (biologist) =

British immunologist, molecular biologist and cancer researcher

Professor Sir David Lane FRS FRSE FRCP FRCSE FMedSci
- Born: David Philip Lane; 1 July 1952 (age 74); Wimbledon, London, England
- Education: University College, London
- Known for: Discovery of p53
- Awards: Paul Ehrlich and Ludwig Darmstaedter Prize (1998)
- Scientific career
- Fields: immunology
- Workplaces: Karolinska Institute
- Doctoral students: Sara Mole

Sir David Philip Lane (born 1 July 1952) is a British immunologist, molecular biologist and cancer researcher. He is currently working in the Department of Microbiology, Tumor and Cell Biology at the Karolinska Institute and is Chairman of Chugai Pharmabody. He is best known for the discovery of p53, one of the most important tumour suppressor genes.

== Education ==
Lane attended The John Fisher School in Purley, South London. He completed his undergraduate and postgraduate degrees at University College, London where he studied auto-immunity under the supervision of Avrion Mitchison.

== Career and research ==
Lane carried out postdoctoral research first at the Imperial Cancer Research Fund (ICRF) in London with Lionel Crawford and then at the Cold Spring Harbor Laboratory in New York with Joseph Sambrook. On returning to the UK, Lane set up his own laboratory with Cancer Research Campaign (CRC) funding at Imperial College, London, then moving to the ICRF laboratories at Clare Hall before moving in 1990 to the University of Dundee to help establish the CRC laboratories there.

He has played an active part in UK science, sitting at various times on the scientific committee of the CRC, the Cell Board of the MRC, and on the council of the ICRF. He is dedicated to the successful translation of research for patient benefit and participated in the early discussions around the scientific benefits of the merger of ICRF and CRC, before serving as chief scientist to their successor, Cancer Research UK, until 2010.

Lane founded the Dundee-based Biotechnology company, Cyclacel Ltd and was the chief scientific officer from 1996 to 2004. From 2004 to 2007, he was the executive director of the Institute of Molecular & Cell Biology (IMCB) in Singapore.

Sir David was chief scientist of Singapore's Agency for Science, Technology and Research (A*STAR, Singapore). He is also professor of tumour suppressor biology at the Department of Microbiology, Tumor and Cell Biology at the Karolinska Institute, where he is heading a research group.

Lane has published more than 350 research articles that have been cited over 100,000 times and is internationally recognised for his original discovery of the p53 protein SV40 T antigen complex and for his many subsequent contributions to the p53 field. The p53 gene is the most frequently altered gene in human cancer with more than half of all cancers having mutant p53. He is co-author with Ed Harlow of the most successful practical guide to the use of immunochemical methods. The "Antibodies" manual has sold over 40,000 copies.

=== Awards and honours ===
Lane is a member of the European Molecular Biology Organization (EMBO), and in 1996 was elected a Fellow of the Royal Society, the UK's premier Academy. He is also a Fellow of the Royal Society of Edinburgh, the Royal College of Pathologists, the Royal College of Surgeons of Edinburgh and a founder member of the Academy of Medical Sciences.

He has won many international prizes for his work including the Joseph Steiner Prize, the Meyenburg Prize (1995), the Yvette Mayent Prize, the Paul Ehrlich Prize and the Cancer Research UK Lifetime Achievement Prize (2012). He has been awarded honorary degrees from the Universities of Toulouse, Birmingham, Aberdeen, Stirling, Abertay, Brno and Nottingham. He has also been recognized for his business acumen with the award of Emerging Entrepreneur of the year.

On 29 September 2016, The John Fisher School opened the Sir David Lane building. In 2018, he became a laureate of the Asian Scientist 100 by the Asian Scientist.

He was knighted for his contribution to cancer research in the New Year honours list in January 2000.
