= Sedolisin =

S8/S53 domain
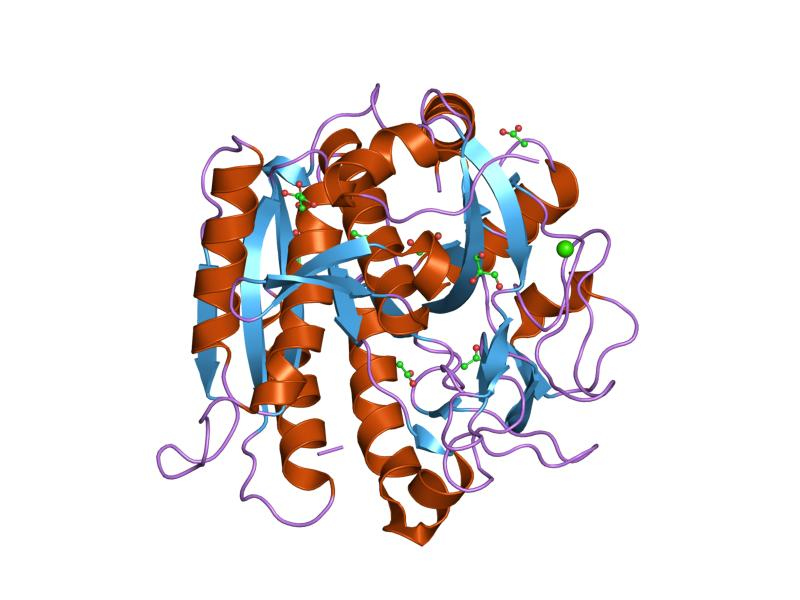
- Structure of pseudomonalisin (PDB: 1GA6)

Identifiers
- Symbol: Peptidase_S8
- Pfam: PF00082
- InterPro: IPR000209
- PROSITE: PDOC00125
- CATH: 1GA6
- SCOP2: 1GA6 / SCOPe / SUPFAM
- CDD: cd07477
Available protein structures:
- PDB: IPR000209 PF00082 (ECOD; PDBsum)
- AlphaFold: IPR000209; PF00082

The sedolisin (MEROPS S53) family of peptidases are a family of serine proteases structurally related to the subtilisin (S8) family. Well-known members of this family include sedolisin ("pseudomonalisin") found in Pseudomonas bacteria, xanthomonalisin ("sedolisin-B"), physarolisin as well as animal tripeptidyl peptidase I. It is also known as sedolysin or serine-carboxyl peptidase. This group of enzymes contains a variation on the catalytic triad: unlike S8 which uses Ser-His-Asp, this group runs on Ser-Glu-Asp, with an additional acidic residue Asp in the oxyanion hole.

Their optimal pH is around 3. Most members of the family are produced as a precursor protein with N-terminal (InterPro: IPR015366) and sometimes C-terminal peptides that need to be cleaved off.

== Family members ==
=== Sedolisin ===
Sedolisin

Identifiers
- EC no.: 3.4.21.100
- CAS no.: 848318-58-1

Databases
- BRENDA: enzyme data
- ExPASy: NiceZyme view
- KEGG: enzyme entry
- MetaCyc: metabolic pathway
- Rhea: reactions
- PDB structures: RCSB PDB PDBe PDBsum
Search
- PMC: articles
- PubMed: articles
- NCBI: proteins

Sedolisin (P42790, pseudomonapepsin, sedolysin) is a serine protease. It is secreted by Pseudomonas sp. 101. It performs hydrolysis of the B chain of insulin at -Glu^{13}-Ala-, -Leu^{15}-Tyr- and -Phe^{25}-Tyr-, and angiotensin I at -Tyr^{4}-Ile-. A good synthetic substrate is Lys-Pro-Ile-Glu-Phe-Phe(NO_{2})-Arg-Leu.

=== Xanthomonalisin ===
Xanthomonalisin

Identifiers
- EC no.: 3.4.21.101
- CAS no.: 113356-29-9

Databases
- BRENDA: enzyme data
- ExPASy: NiceZyme view
- KEGG: enzyme entry
- MetaCyc: metabolic pathway
- Rhea: reactions
- PDB structures: RCSB PDB PDBe PDBsum
Search
- PMC: articles
- PubMed: articles
- NCBI: proteins

Xanthomonalisin (Q60106) is found in Xanthomonas bacteria. It cleaves caesin and clots milk.

=== Physarolisin ===
Physarolisin

Identifiers
- EC no.: 3.4.21.103
- CAS no.: 94949-28-7

Databases
- BRENDA: enzyme data
- ExPASy: NiceZyme view
- KEGG: enzyme entry
- MetaCyc: metabolic pathway
- Rhea: reactions
- PDB structures: RCSB PDB PDBe PDBsum
Search
- PMC: articles
- PubMed: articles
- NCBI: proteins

Physarolisin (Q8MZS4, physaropepsin) is a milk-clotting enzyme. It shows preferential cleavage of Gly^{8}-Ser in B chain of insulin most rapidly, followed by Leu^{11}!Val, Cys(SO_{3}H)^{19}-Gly and Phe^{24}-Phe.

It is special in that it is cold-adapted. It was discovered in the slime mold Physarum flavicomum. Similar proteins (InterPro: IPR017001) are also found in archaea.
