= Finnish Association on Intellectual and Developmental Disabilities =

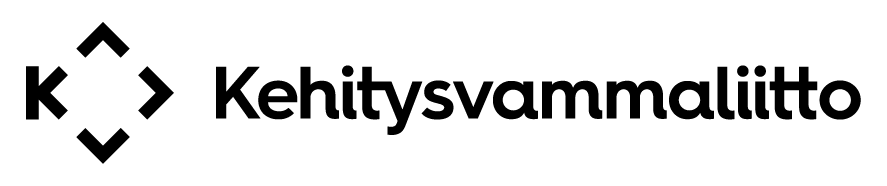

The Finnish Association on Intellectual and Developmental Disabilities (FAIDD) promotes good life, equality and participation for people with intellectual disabilities and others who need support with learning, understanding and communicating. The goal of FAIDD is that all people can live together from an equal footing.

The FAIDD headquarters are located in the Leppävaara district in Espoo, Finland.

FAIDD was founded in 1952. Its most significant financier is Veikkaus.

== Main operating areas ==
The main operating areas of FAIDD are research, development, personnel training, production of materials, promoting plain-language information and culture, furthering accessible and participatory communication and use of information technology, as well as providing and exchanging information and exercising social influence.

FAIDD is a social actor, a centre of knowledge and skills and a forum of cooperation. FAIDD engages in diverse cooperation with people with disabilities and their families and carers, professionals in the field, service providers, organisations, businesses and public authorities.

The core operating areas are:

- intellectual and developmental disabilities and speech impairments
- communication and interactivity
- accessibility
- learning
- accommodation
- work

All FAIDD activities are based on a commitment to the following values:

- respect for human dignity
- expertise
- reliability
- interactivity
- accessibility

The strategy of FAIDD is focused, for instance, on the following areas:

- Protecting and promoting interests – e.g. exercising influence to develop legislation in the field of intellectual and developmental disabilities.
- Raising awareness on the needs and opportunities of the target groups.
- Quality services through expertise.
- Promoting research.
- Promoting accessibility – e.g. promoting access to information by means of plain language material and communications.
- Promoting participation, right of self-determination and empowerment in the target group – e.g. influencing attitudes through public and media relations.
- Promotion of lifelong learning – e.g. by producing teaching material for the target group in basic and second-degree education.

== International activities ==
FAIDD participates in a range of international activities and is a member of many European collaborative networks and projects. FAIDD has also carried out several projects in St Petersburg with support from the Finnish Ministry for Foreign Affairs and the European Commission.

== Members ==
The actual members of FAIDD are joint municipal authorities, municipalities, congregations, registered voluntary organisations and foundations. The support members are private individuals. The members work in the field of intellectual and developmental disabilities or act otherwise in the interest of disabled people.

== Internet services ==
In addition to the FAIDD homepage, the association maintains several other internet services, some of which also offer information in English:

- Papunet features games, exercises and stories for rehabilitation, teaching and recreation.
- Finnish Centre for Easy Language pages contain, for example, information on the theory of plain language.

== See also ==
- Autism
- Developmental disability
- Down syndrome
- Fetal alcohol spectrum disorder
- Finnish heritage disease
- INCL
- Inclusion
- Learning disability
- Intellectual disability
- Plain language
