= PPT2 =

Protein-coding gene in the species Homo sapiens

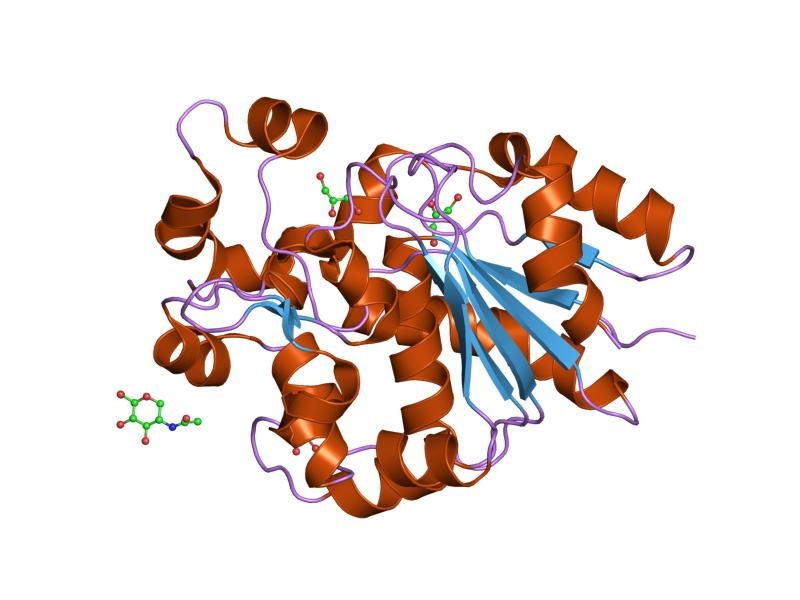

Identifiers
- Aliases: PPT2, C6orf8, G14, PPT-2, palmitoyl-protein thioesterase 2
- External IDs: OMIM: 603298; MGI: 1860075; GeneCards: PPT2
Available structures
| PDB | Ortholog search: PDBe RCSB |
| PDB | List of PDB id codes 1PJA |
Enzyme activity
| EC # | BRENDA | ExPASy | KEGG | MetaCyc |
|---|---|---|---|---|
| 3.1.2.2 | ↗ | ↗ | ↗ | ↗ |

Gene location (Human)
| Chr. | Chromosome 6 (human) |
| Band | 6p21.32 | Start | 32,153,441 bp |
| Band | 6p21.32 | End | 32,163,678 bp |

Gene location (Mouse)
| Chr. | Chromosome 17 (mouse) |
| Band | 17 B1|17 18.19 cM | Start | 34,835,636 bp |
| Band | 17 B1|17 18.19 cM | End | 34,847,484 bp |
RNA expression pattern
| Bgee | Human / Mouse (ortholog); Top expressed in: left ovary; right ovary; right hemisphere of cerebellum; tibial nerve; left uterine tube; canal of the cervix; body of uterus; skin of leg; vagina; ectocervix / Top expressed in: otic placode; right kidney; proximal tubule; saccule; ankle; external carotid artery; human kidney; otic vesicle; internal carotid artery; molar; More reference expression data |
| BioGPS | n/a |
Gene ontology
| Molecular function | hydrolase activity; thiolester hydrolase activity; palmitoyl-(protein) hydrolase activity; palmitoyl hydrolase activity |
| Cellular component | lysosome; lysosomal lumen; extracellular exosome; intracellular membrane-bounded organelle; integral component of membrane; membrane |
| Biological process | macromolecule depalmitoylation; fatty-acyl-CoA biosynthetic process |
Sources:Amigo / QuickGO
Orthologs
| Databases | NCBI: entry; OMA: entry |
| Species | Human | Mouse |
| Entrez | 9374 | 54397 |
| Ensembl | ENSG00000227600; ENSG00000231618; ENSG00000168452; ENSG00000228116; ENSG00000236649 ENSG00000206256; ENSG00000206329; ENSG00000221988 | ENSMUSG00000015474 |
| UniProt | Q9UMR5 | O35448 |
| RefSeq (mRNA) | NM_138934; NM_001204103; NM_005155; NM_138717 | NM_019441; NM_001302393; NM_001302394; NM_001302395; NM_001302396 |
| RefSeq (protein) | NP_001191032; NP_005146; NP_619731 | NP_001289322; NP_001289323; NP_001289324; NP_001289325; NP_062314 |
| Location (UCSC) | Chr 6: 32.15 – 32.16 Mb | Chr 17: 34.84 – 34.85 Mb |
| PubMed search |
- Wikidata
| View/Edit Human | View/Edit Mouse |

Lysosomal thioesterase PPT2 (PPT-2), also known as S-thioesterase G14, is an enzyme that in humans is encoded by the PPT2 gene.

== Function ==
This gene encodes a member of the palmitoyl protein thioesterase family. The encoded glycosylated lysosomal protein has palmitoyl-CoA hydrolase activity in vitro, but does not hydrolyze palmitate from cysteine residues in proteins.
