= Tripeptidyl peptidase I =

Protein-coding gene in the species Homo sapiens

TPP1
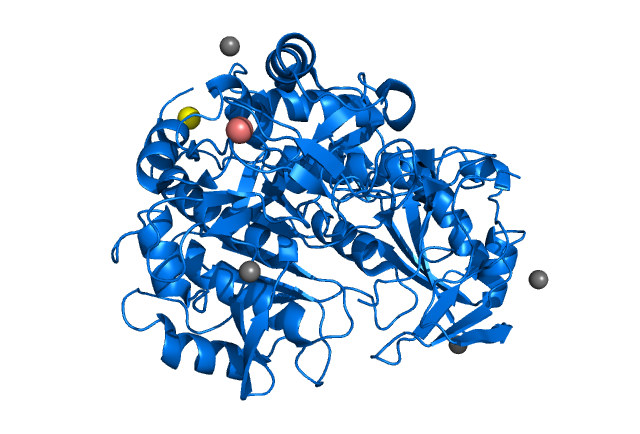

Identifiers
- Aliases: TPP1, CLN2, LPIC, SCAR7, TPP-1, GIG1, Tripeptidyl peptidase I, tripeptidyl peptidase 1
- External IDs: OMIM: 607998; MGI: 1336194; GeneCards: TPP1
Available structures
PDB	Ortholog search: PDBe RCSB
PDB	List of PDB id codes 3EDY, 3EE6
Enzyme activity
EC #	BRENDA	ExPASy	KEGG	MetaCyc
3.4.14.9	↗	↗	↗	↗

Gene location (Human)
Chr.	Chromosome 11 (human)
Band	11p15.4	Start	6,612,768 bp
Band	11p15.4	End	6,619,448 bp

Gene location (Mouse)
Chr.	Chromosome 7 (mouse)
Band	7 E3|7 55.97 cM	Start	105,394,018 bp
Band	7 E3|7 55.97 cM	End	105,401,442 bp
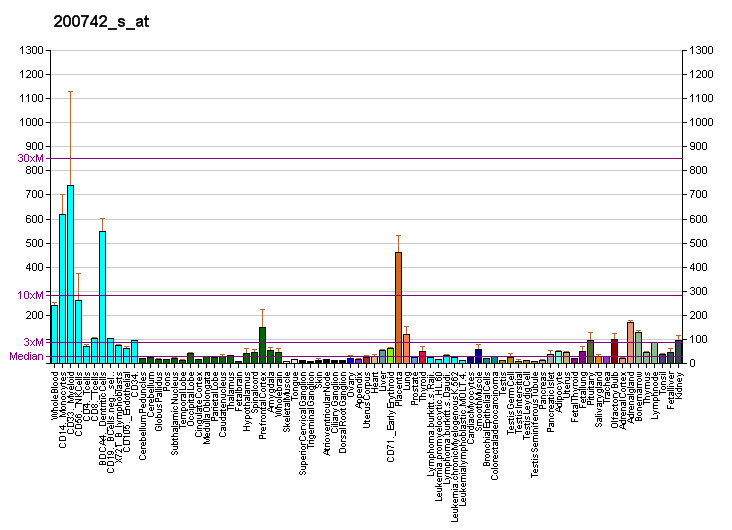

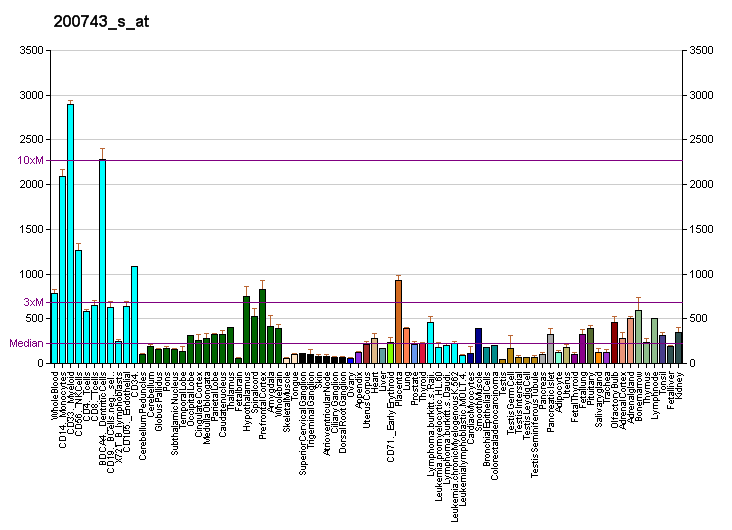

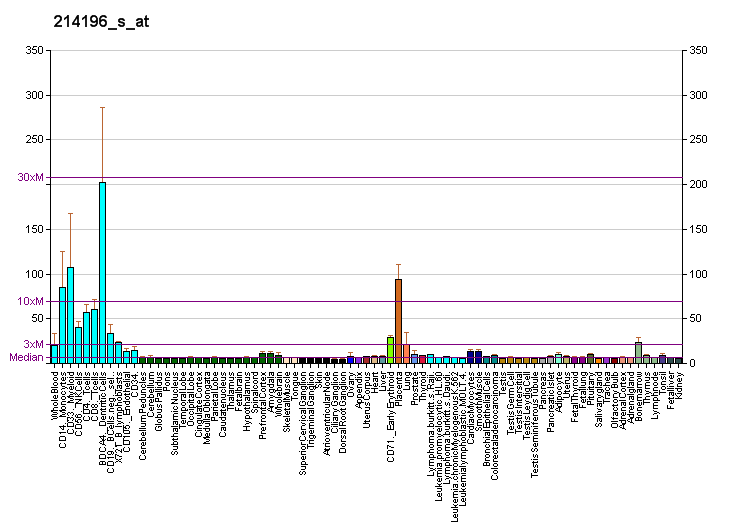
RNA expression pattern
Bgee	Human / Mouse (ortholog); Top expressed in: retinal pigment epithelium; dorsal motor nucleus of vagus nerve; inferior olivary nucleus; right adrenal cortex; germinal epithelium; visceral pleura; stromal cell of endometrium; left adrenal gland; spleen; parietal pleura / Top expressed in: choroid plexus of fourth ventricle; calvaria; stroma of bone marrow; tibiofemoral joint; retinal pigment epithelium; transitional epithelium of urinary bladder; decidua; right kidney; ciliary body; right lung; More reference expression data
BioGPS	More reference expression data
Gene ontology
Molecular function	tripeptidyl-peptidase activity; peptide binding; endopeptidase activity; metal ion binding; peptidase activity; protein binding; serine-type peptidase activity; serine-type endopeptidase activity; hydrolase activity
Cellular component	melanosome; lysosomal lumen; mitochondrion; lysosome; extracellular exosome
Biological process	epithelial cell differentiation; neuromuscular process controlling balance; lipid metabolism; bone resorption; nervous system development; proteolysis; central nervous system development; IRE1-mediated unfolded protein response; protein catabolic process; lysosome organization; peptide catabolic process
Sources:Amigo / QuickGO
Orthologs
Databases	NCBI: entry; OMA: entry
Species	Human	Mouse
Entrez	1200	12751
Ensembl	ENSG00000166340	ENSMUSG00000030894
UniProt	O14773	O89023
RefSeq (mRNA)	NM_000391	NM_009906
RefSeq (protein)	NP_000382	NP_034036
Location (UCSC)	Chr 11: 6.61 – 6.62 Mb	Chr 7: 105.39 – 105.4 Mb
PubMed search
- Wikidata
View/Edit Human	View/Edit Mouse

Tripeptidyl-peptidase 1, also known as Lysosomal pepstatin-insensitive protease, is an enzyme that in humans is encoded by the TPP1 gene, also known as CLN2. TPP1 should not be confused with the TPP1 shelterin protein which protects telomeres and is encoded by the ACD gene. Mutations in the TPP1 gene leads to late-infantile neuronal ceroid lipofuscinosis.

== Structure ==
=== Gene ===
The human gene TPP1 encodes a member of the sedolisin family of serine protease enzymes. The human gene has 13 exons and locates at the chromosome band 11p15. It is also known as CLN2, due to the relation to the disease.

=== Protein ===
The human TPP1 is 61kDa in size and composed of 563 amino acids. An isoform of 34.5kDa and 320 amino acids is generated by alternative splicing and a peptide fragment of 1-243 amino acid is missing. TPP1 contains a globular structure with a subtilisin-like fold, a Ser475-Glu272-Asp360 catalytic triad. It also contains an octahedrally coordinated Ca^{2+}-binding site that are characteristic features of the S53 sedolisin family of peptidases. Unlike other S53 peptidases, it has steric constraints on the P4 substrate pocket, which might contribute to its preferential cleavage of tripeptides from the unsubstituted N-terminus of proteins. Two alternative conformations of the catalytic Asp276 are associated with the activation status of TPP1.

== Function ==
High expression of TPP1 is found in bone marrow, placenta, lung, pineal and lymphocytes. The protease functions in the lysosome to cleave N-terminal tripeptides from substrates and has weaker endopeptidase activity. It is synthesized as a catalytically inactive enzyme which is activated and autoproteolyzed upon acidification.

== Clinical significance ==
The neuronal ceroid lipofuscinoses (NCLs) are a group of inherited neurodegenerative disorders with pathological phenotypes that auto fluorescent lipopigments present in neurons and other cell types. Bi-allelic mutations of the gene TPP1 have been found to result in one of these disorders, called late-infantile neuronal ceroid lipofuscinosis, also known as CLN type 2 or Jansky–Bielschowsky disease. Mutations of gene is associated with the failure to degrade specific neuropeptides and a subunit of ATP synthase in the lysosome and accumulation of the fluorescent pigments. The disease causes childhood onset neurodegeneration resulting in epilepsy, movement disorders and progressive loss of motor and cognitive skills. Additionally, it causes retinal degeneration resulting in progressive loss of vision. Enzyme replacement therapy with cerliponase alfa can alter this course of disease, and is licensed for use in several countries.
