= CLN5 =

Protein-coding gene in humans

Identifiers
- Aliases: CLN5, NCL, ceroid-lipofuscinosis, neuronal 5, intracellular trafficking protein, CLN5 intracellular trafficking protein
- External IDs: OMIM: 608102; MGI: 2442253; GeneCards: CLN5
Enzyme activity
| EC # | BRENDA | ExPASy | KEGG | MetaCyc |
|---|---|---|---|---|
| 3.1.2.22 | ↗ | ↗ | ↗ | ↗ |

Gene location (Human)
| Chr. | Chromosome 13 (human) |
| Band | 13q22.3 | Start | 76,990,660 bp |
| Band | 13q22.3 | End | 77,019,143 bp |

Gene location (Mouse)
| Chr. | Chromosome 14 (mouse) |
| Band | 14 E2.3|14 51.71 cM | Start | 103,307,652 bp |
| Band | 14 E2.3|14 51.71 cM | End | 103,315,064 bp |
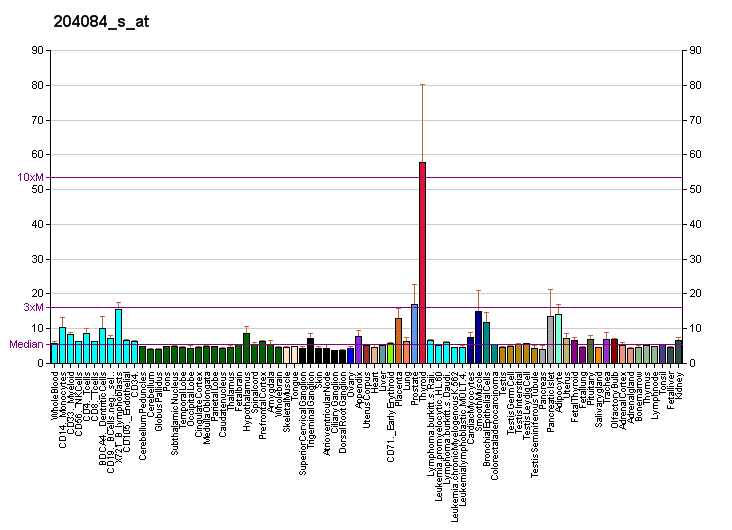

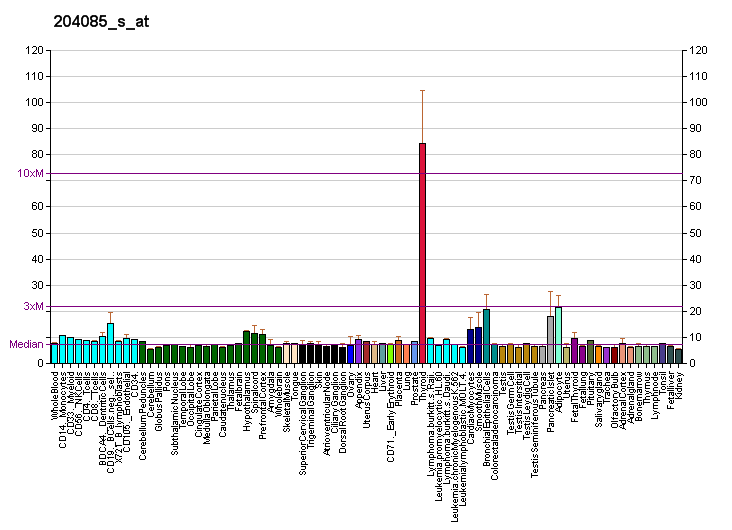

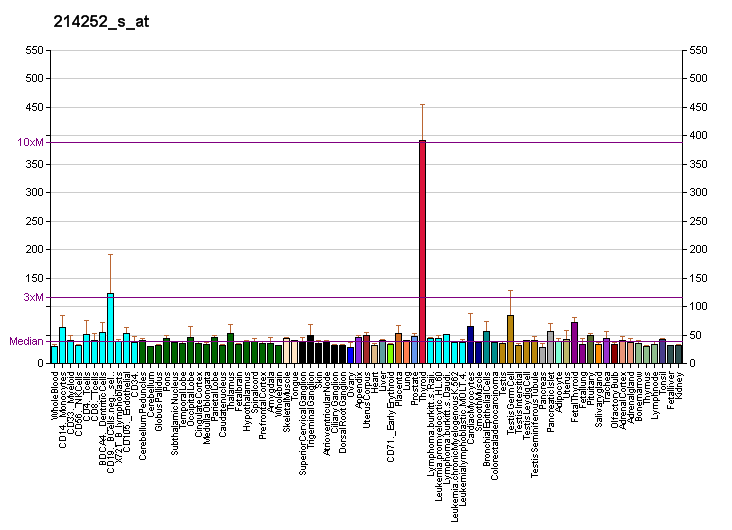
RNA expression pattern
| Bgee | Human / Mouse (ortholog); Top expressed in: left lobe of thyroid gland; right lobe of thyroid gland; pericardium; renal medulla; Achilles tendon; olfactory zone of nasal mucosa; islet of Langerhans; popliteal artery; tibial arteries; gallbladder / Top expressed in: granulocyte; decidua; blood; calvaria; gastrula; right kidney; interventricular septum; yolk sac; genital tubercle; endothelial cell of lymphatic vessel; More reference expression data |
| BioGPS | More reference expression data |
Gene ontology
| Molecular function | protein binding; mannose binding |
| Cellular component | perinuclear region of cytoplasm; lysosomal membrane; Golgi apparatus; extracellular exosome; endoplasmic reticulum; lysosome; cytosol; membrane; integral component of membrane |
| Biological process | glycosylation; brain development; lysosomal lumen acidification; signal peptide processing; protein catabolic process; neuron maturation; retrograde transport, endosome to Golgi; positive regulation of GTP binding; neurogenesis |
Sources:Amigo / QuickGO
Orthologs
| Databases | NCBI: entry; OMA: entry |
| Species | Human | Mouse |
| Entrez | 1203 | 211286 |
| Ensembl | ENSG00000102805 | ENSMUSG00000022125 |
| UniProt | O75503 | Q3UMW8 |
| RefSeq (mRNA) | NM_006493; NM_001366624 | NM_001033242 |
| RefSeq (protein) | NP_006484; NP_001353553 | NP_001028414 |
| Location (UCSC) | Chr 13: 76.99 – 77.02 Mb | Chr 14: 103.31 – 103.32 Mb |
| PubMed search |
- Wikidata
| View/Edit Human | View/Edit Mouse |

Ceroid-lipofuscinosis neuronal protein 5 is a protein that in humans is encoded by the CLN5 gene.

The neuronal ceroid lipofuscinoses (CLN or NCL) are a group of autosomal recessive, progressive encephalopathies in children. They are characterized by psychomotor deterioration, visual failure, and the accumulation of autofluorescent lipopigment in neurons and other cell types. The main childhood forms are the infantile type (Santavuori-Haltia disease; MIM 256730), the late infantile type (Jansky–Bielschowsky disease; MIM 204500), and the juvenile type (Batten disease; MIM 204200) based on the age of onset, clinical course, neurologic and ophthalmologic findings, and ultrastructural analysis (Carpenter et al., 1977 [PubMed 193610]).[supplied by OMIM]

A human clinical trial of gene therapy for the CLN5 form of Batten disease began in 2022 through the University of Rochester, using vectors developed by the Hughes research lab in New Zealand.
