= Northern epilepsy syndrome =

- Other names: Neuronal ceroid lipofuscinosis, Northern epilepsy variant
- This condition is inherited in an autosomal recessive manner.

Northern epilepsy syndrome (NE), or progressive epilepsy with mental retardation (EPMR), is a subtype of neuronal ceroid lipofuscinosis and a rare disease that is regarded as a Finnish heritage disease. Unlike most Finnish heritage diseases, this syndrome has been reported only in Finland. The disease is characterized by seizures in early childhood that progressively get worse until after puberty. Once the onset of seizures occurs, mental degradation is seen. This continues into adulthood, even after seizure frequency has decreased. The cause of the disease is a missense mutation on chromosome 8. The creation of a new protein occurs, and the lipid content of the brain is altered because of it. The ratio of the mutation carriers is 1:135. There is nothing that has been found to stop the progression of the disease, but symptomatic approaches, such as the use of benzodiazepines, have helped control seizures.

== Characteristics ==
=== Early childhood ===
Northern epilepsy syndrome causes recurrent seizures between the ages of five and ten. These seizures, that may last up to 15 minutes, can be classified mostly as tonic-clonic, but partial seizures could also occur. The seizures commonly involve muscle rigidity, convulsions and loss of consciousness. Generally, the recurrence is one to two times per month. In the years following the onset of seizures, a noticeable decrease in intellectual capacity is observed.

=== Adolescence ===
During puberty, seizure frequency increases to one to two times per week. Mental function has a rapid decline, as observed by a lack of coordination, failure to complete education and fine motor activities. In rare cases, some suffered from loss of vision.

=== Adulthood ===
Seizure frequency is reduced to four to six seizures per year. By this time, they are mentally and physically incapable to live without assistance due to the total mental degradation. Life expectancy is at least 50 years of age, which is shorter than the average worldwide age of 70.

== Genetic causes ==
Northern epilepsy syndrome is caused by an inherited autosomal recessive mutation in the telomeric region of the short arm of chromosome 8. There are at least ten mutations within the chromosome that cause the disease, and the most common missense mutation occurs at codon 24, where a glycine takes the place of an arginine. This primary mutation can also be paired with a missense at codon 237, where an arginine takes the place of a glycine. When the two mutations interact, a lengthened progression of the disease is observed. The primary mutation (Arg24Gly) creates the protein CLN8. A total of 1 in every 135 people of Finnish descent were reported to be a carrier of the mutation. The difference between 1-CLN8 and 2-CLN8 is the number of mutations and the mutation's location in the chromosome.

== Pathophysiology ==
An accumulation of transmembrane protein is seen in the brain tissue of Northern epilepsy patients. This protein is a 286 amino acid transmembrane protein that has not been identified before, meaning that it is unique to Northern epilepsy syndrome. CLN8 has been linked to the accumulation of subunit c of mitochondrial ATP synthase and a small amount of sphingolipid activator proteins in the neurons. β-amyloid, a peptide involved in Alzheimer's disease, is also seen in this protein accumulation.

== Diagnosis ==
A patient's DNA is sequenced from a blood sample with the use of the ABI Big Dye Terminator v.3.0 kit. Since this is a genetic disease, the basis of diagnosis lies in identifying genetic mutations or chromosomal abnormalities. The DNA sequence can be run with CLN8 Sanger sequencing or CLN8 Targeted Familial Mutations whether its single, double, or triple exon sequencing. Also, preliminary evidence of the disease can be detected by means of MRI and EEG. These tests identify lipid content of the brain, and any anomaly from the norm may be linked to Northern epilepsy.

== Treatment ==
Current available treatment is limited to treating the symptoms, not the cause. Seizure frequency can be regulated by the use of drugs such as clonazepam (or other benzodiazepines) and sodium valproate. Clonazepam functions by increasing GABA activity at the GABA_{A} receptor. GABA is an inhibitory neurotransmitter, and therefore its increased activity hyperpolarizes cells. Clonazepam has been effective in minimising seizure activity, especially during puberty. Sodium valproate prevents the depolarization of the cell by blocking sodium ion channels and inhibitory GABA enzymes. Both of these anticonvulsants lead to depression of the central nervous system.

== Prognosis ==
Life expectancy is only moderately affected by NE because the rate of disease progression is slow. Patients usually survive past 40–50 years of age.

== History ==
Northern epilepsy originated in northern Finland, and it still appears to only affect individuals of Finnish ancestry. 1 in 10,000 individuals who live or are from the region of Kainuu in northern Finland have the condition.

Northern epilepsy was not initially recognized as a neuronal ceroid lipofuscinosis (NCL). In 1999, it was found to be the first disease identified caused by mutations in the CLN8 gene. The disease is now known as the mildest form of NCL. There are two forms of this mutated gene: 1-CLN8 and 2-CLN8. 1-CLN8 is known as Northern epilepsy syndrome, while 2-CLN8 is primarily from Turkish descent.

== See also ==
- Epilepsy
- Neuronal ceroid lipofuscinosis
- CLN8
