= Palmitoyl(protein) hydrolase =

Class of enzymes

Palmitoyl protein thioesterase
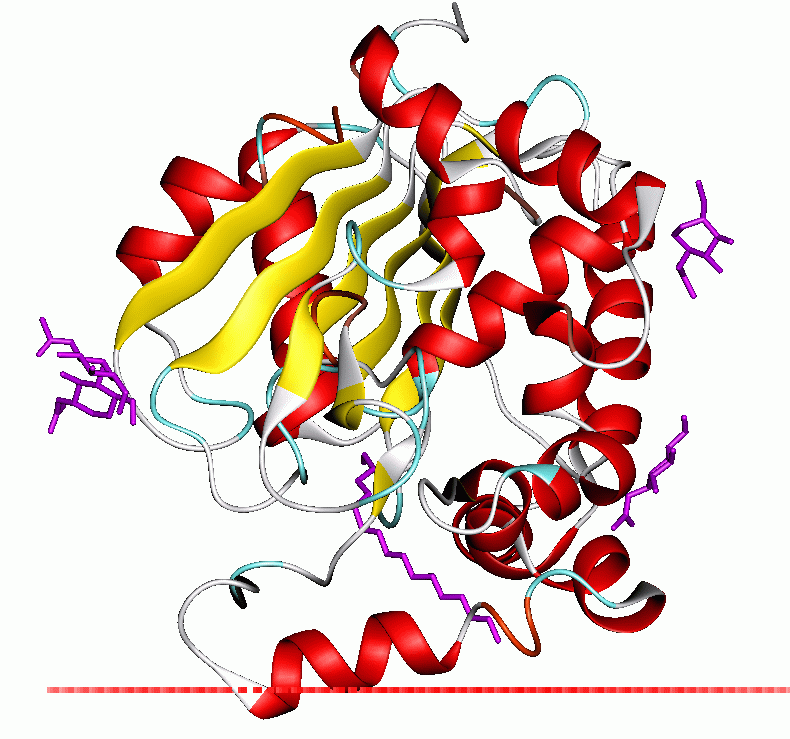
- Palmitoyl protein thioesterase 1. Red plane shows hydrocarbon boundary of the lipid bilayer

Identifiers
- Symbol: Palm_thioest
- Pfam: PF02089
- Pfam clan: CL0028
- InterPro: IPR002472
- SCOP2: 1exw / SCOPe / SUPFAM
- OPM superfamily: 127
- OPM protein: 1eh5
Available protein structures:
- Pfam: structures / ECOD
- PDB: RCSB PDB; PDBe; PDBj
- PDBsum: structure summary

palmitoyl [protein] hydrolase

Identifiers
- EC no.: 3.1.2.22
- CAS no.: 150605-49-5

Databases
- IntEnz: IntEnz view
- BRENDA: BRENDA entry
- ExPASy: NiceZyme view
- KEGG: KEGG entry
- MetaCyc: metabolic pathway
- PRIAM: profile
- PDB structures: RCSB PDB PDBe PDBsum
- Gene Ontology: AmiGO / QuickGO
Search
- PMC: articles
- PubMed: articles
- NCBI: proteins

Palmitoyl protein hydrolase/thioesterases is an enzyme (EC 3.1.2.22) that removes thioester-linked fatty acyl groups such as palmitate from modified cysteine residues in proteins or peptides during lysosomal degradation. It catalyzes the reaction

palmitoyl[protein] + H_{2}O $\rightleftharpoons$ palmitate + protein

This enzyme belongs to the family of hydrolases, specifically those acting on thioester bonds. The systematic name is palmitoyl[protein] hydrolase. Other names in common use include palmitoyl-protein thioesterase, and palmitoyl-(protein) hydrolase. This enzyme participates in fatty acid elongation in mitochondria.

Neuronal ceroid lipofuscinoses (NCL) represent a group of encephalopathies that occur in 1 in 12,500 children. Mutations in the palmitoyl protein thioesterase gene causing infantile neuronal ceroid lipofuscinosis. The most common mutation results in intracellular accumulation of the polypeptide and undetectable enzyme activity in the brain. Direct sequencing of cDNAs derived from brain RNA of INCL patients has shown a mis-sense transversion of A to T at nucleotide position 364, which results in substitution of Trp for Arg at position 122 in the protein - Arg 122 is immediately adjacent to a lipase consensus sequence that contains the putative active site Ser of PPT. The occurrence of this and two other independent mutations in the PPT gene strongly suggests that defects in this gene cause INCL.

== Examples ==
Human proteins containing this domain include:

palmitoyl-protein thioesterase 1

Identifiers
- Symbol: PPT1
- Alt. symbols: PPT
- NCBI gene: 5538
- HGNC: 9325
- OMIM: 600722
- RefSeq: NM_000310
- UniProt: P50897

Other data
- EC number: 3.1.2.22
- Locus: Chr. 1 p32
Search for
- Structures: Swiss-model
- Domains: InterPro

palmitoyl-protein thioesterase 2

Identifiers
- Symbol: PPT2
- Alt. symbols: G14
- NCBI gene: 9374
- HGNC: 9326
- OMIM: 603298
- RefSeq: NM_138717
- UniProt: Q9UMR5

Other data
- EC number: 3.1.2.22
- Locus: Chr. 6 p21.3
Search for
- Structures: Swiss-model
- Domains: InterPro

== Structural studies ==
As of late 2007, 4 structures have been solved for this class of enzymes, with PDB accession codes 1EH5, 1EI9, 1EXW, and 1PJA.

== See also ==
- palmitoyl
- Acyl-protein thioesterases
