= Cathepsin D =

Protein-coding gene in the species Homo sapiens

CTSD
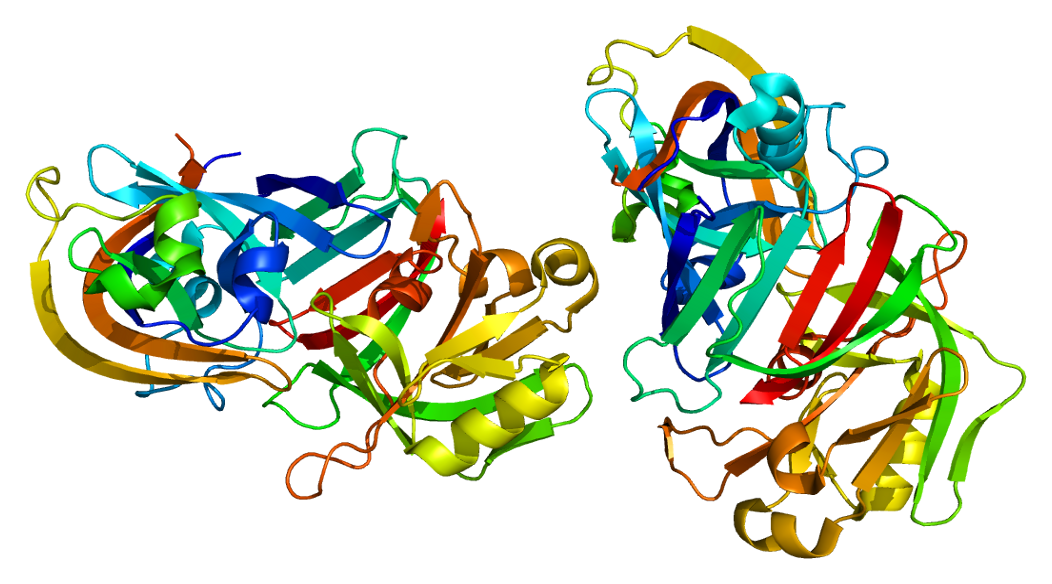

Identifiers
- Aliases: CTSD, CLN10, CPSD, HEL-S-130P, cathepsin D
- External IDs: OMIM: 116840; MGI: 88562; GeneCards: CTSD
Available structures
PDB	Ortholog search: PDBe RCSB
PDB	List of PDB id codes 1LYA, 1LYB, 1LYW, 4OBZ, 4OC6, 4OD9
Enzyme activity
EC #	BRENDA	ExPASy	KEGG	MetaCyc
3.4.23.5	↗	↗	↗	↗

Gene location (Human)
Chr.	Chromosome 11 (human)
Band	11p15.5	Start	1,752,752 bp
Band	11p15.5	End	1,764,573 bp

Gene location (Mouse)
Chr.	Chromosome 7 (mouse)
Band	7|7 F5	Start	141,929,648 bp
Band	7|7 F5	End	141,941,775 bp
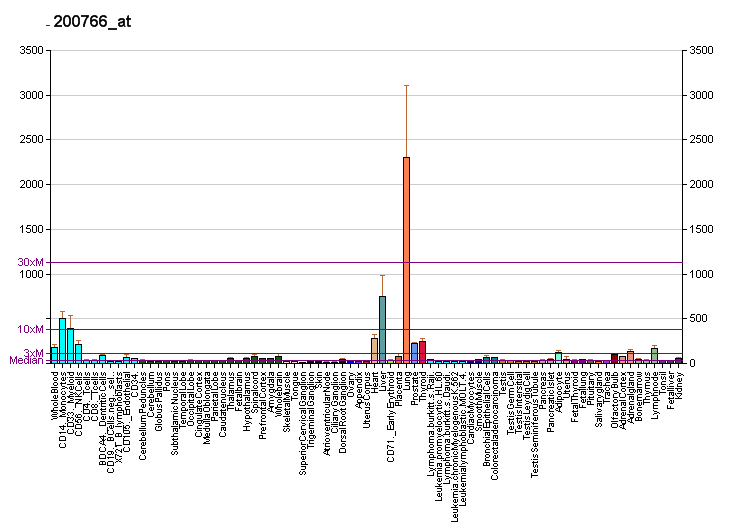

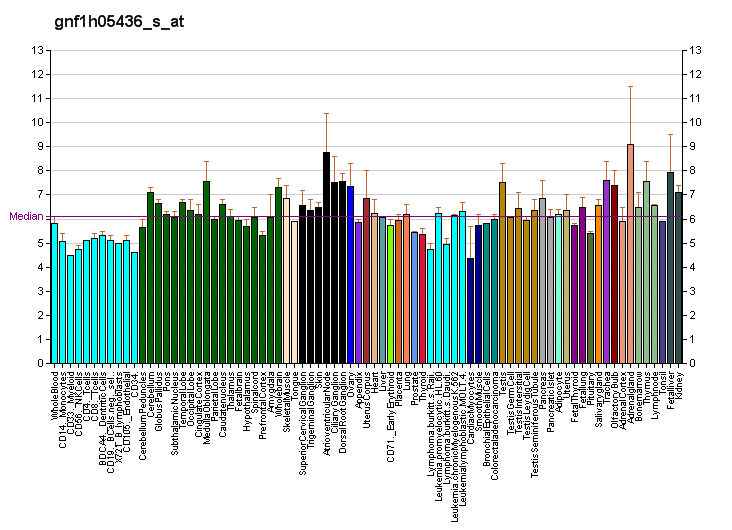
RNA expression pattern
Bgee	Human / Mouse (ortholog); Top expressed in: right adrenal cortex; left adrenal gland; left adrenal cortex; apex of heart; stromal cell of endometrium; right lung; granulocyte; upper lobe of left lung; gallbladder; olfactory zone of nasal mucosa / Top expressed in: choroid plexus of fourth ventricle; stroma of bone marrow; calvaria; granulocyte; transitional epithelium of urinary bladder; lip; esophagus; muscle of thigh; retinal pigment epithelium; mesenteric lymph nodes; More reference expression data
BioGPS	More reference expression data
Gene ontology
Molecular function	peptidase activity; hydrolase activity; protein binding; serine-type endopeptidase activity; cysteine-type endopeptidase activity; aspartic-type endopeptidase activity; aspartic-type peptidase activity
Cellular component	lysosomal lumen; extracellular exosome; membrane raft; extracellular matrix; lysosome; melanosome; extracellular space; specific granule lumen; tertiary granule lumen; ficolin-1-rich granule lumen; extracellular region; collagen-containing extracellular matrix; lysosomal membrane; endosome membrane
Biological process	protein catabolic process; autophagy; collagen catabolic process; antigen processing and presentation of exogenous peptide antigen via MHC class II; proteolysis; neutrophil degranulation; lipoprotein catabolic process; positive regulation of apoptotic process; positive regulation of cysteine-type endopeptidase activity involved in apoptotic process; regulation of establishment of protein localization
Sources:Amigo / QuickGO
Orthologs
Databases	NCBI: entry; OMA: entry
Species	Human	Mouse
Entrez	1509	13033
Ensembl	ENSG00000117984	ENSMUSG00000007891
UniProt	P07339	P18242
RefSeq (mRNA)	NM_001909	NM_009983
RefSeq (protein)	NP_001900	NP_034113
Location (UCSC)	Chr 11: 1.75 – 1.76 Mb	Chr 7: 141.93 – 141.94 Mb
PubMed search
- Wikidata
View/Edit Human	View/Edit Mouse

Cathepsin D is a protein that in humans is encoded by the CTSD gene. This gene encodes a lysosomal aspartyl protease composed of a protein dimer of disulfide-linked heavy and light chains, both produced from a single protein precursor. Cathepsin D is an aspartic endo-protease that is ubiquitously distributed in lysosomes. The main function of cathepsin D is to degrade proteins and activate precursors of bioactive proteins in pre-lysosomal compartments. This proteinase, which is a member of the peptidase A1 family, has a specificity similar to but narrower than that of pepsin A. Transcription of the CTSD gene is initiated from several sites, including one that is a start site for an estrogen-regulated transcript. Mutations in this gene are involved in the pathogenesis of several diseases, including breast cancer and possibly Alzheimer's disease. Homozygous deletion of the CTSD gene leads to early lethality in the postnatal phase. Deficiency of CTSD gene has been reported an underlying cause of neuronal ceroid lipofuscinosis (NCL).

== Structure ==
=== Gene ===
The CTSD gene is located at chromosome 11.

=== Protein ===
The catalytic sites of cathepsin D include two critical aspartic residues (amino acid 33 and 231) located on the 14 kDa and 34kDa chains. The ultimate form of mature cathepsin D is composed of 337 amino acid residues, 196 amino acid residues in the heavy chain and 141 in the light chain. These two chains are linked by the hydrophobic effect.

== Function ==
The optimum pH for cathepsin D in vitro is 4.5-5.0. Cathepsin-D is an aspartic protease that depends critically on protonation of its active site Asp residue. Along with Asp-protonation, lower pH also leads to conformational switch in cathepsin-D: the N-terminal segment of the protease moves out of the active site as pH drops. Similar to other aspartic proteases, cathepsin D accommodates up to 8 amino acid residues in the binding cleft of the active site. The main physiological functions of cathepsin D consist of metabolic degradation of intracellular proteins, activation and degradation of polypeptide hormones and growth factors, activation of enzymatic precursors, processing of enzyme activators and inhibitors, brain antigen processing and regulation of programmed cell death. Cathepsin D can also be found in the extracellular space and it is one of the few cathepsins, that shows some activity at neutral pH. It is able to activate the growth factors VEGF-C and VEGF-D, which might partly explain its relevance for tumor progression.

== Clinical significance ==
The NCLs present with progressive loss of visual function and neurodevelopmental decline, seizure, myoclonic jerks and premature death. The CTSD gene is one of the identified eight genes the deficiency of which is responsible for NCLs. It has been reported that a homozygous single nucleotide duplication in exon 6 could alter the reading frame and causes a premature stop codon at position 255. Over-expression of cathepsin D stimulates tumorigenicity and metastasis as well as initiation of tumor apoptosis. This protease has been regarded an independent marker of poor prognosis in breast cancer being correlated with the incidence of clinical metastasis. Knock-out of CTSD gene would cause intestinal necrosis and hemorrhage and increase apoptosis in thymus, indicating that cathepsin D is required in certain epithelial cells for tissue remodeling and renewal. It is also reported that there might be a strong effect for CTSD genotype on Alzheimer disease risk in male. Cathepsin D enzymatic activity induces hydrolytic modification of apolipoprotein B-100-containing lipoproteins, including LDL, which means it may be involved in atherosclerosis as well.

== Interaction ==
- Pepstatin
- Transglutaminase 2
- HEBP1
- A2M
- Ceramide
