= DNAJC5 =

Protein-coding gene in the species Homo sapiens

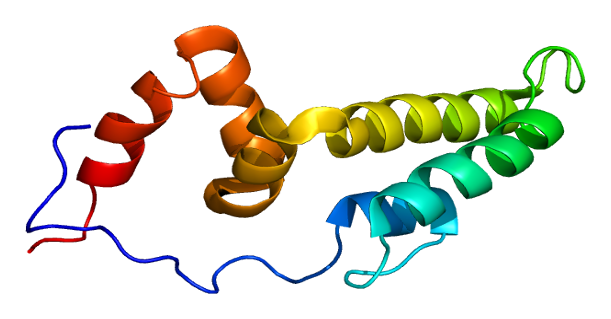

Identifiers
- Aliases: DNAJC5, CLN4, CLN4B, CSP, DNAJC5A, NCL, mir-941-2, mir-941-3, mir-941-4, mir-941-5, DnaJ heat shock protein family (Hsp40) member C5
- External IDs: OMIM: 611203; MGI: 892995; GeneCards: DNAJC5
Available structures
PDB	Ortholog search: PDBe RCSB
PDB	List of PDB id codes 2N05, 2N04

Gene location (Human)
Chr.	Chromosome 20 (human)
Band	20q13.33	Start	63,895,126 bp
Band	20q13.33	End	63,936,031 bp

Gene location (Mouse)
Chr.	Chromosome 2 (mouse)
Band	2 H4|2 103.63 cM	Start	181,162,278 bp
Band	2 H4|2 103.63 cM	End	181,196,926 bp
RNA expression pattern
Bgee	Human / Mouse (ortholog); Top expressed in: cardiac muscle tissue of right atrium; right frontal lobe; Brodmann area 9; right hemisphere of cerebellum; pons; nucleus accumbens; myocardium of left ventricle; gingival epithelium; nasal epithelium; hypothalamus / Top expressed in: barrel cortex; dorsomedial hypothalamic nucleus; substantia nigra; suprachiasmatic nucleus; dentate gyrus of hippocampal formation granule cell; habenula; motor neuron; ventral tegmental area; neural layer of retina; fossa; More reference expression data
BioGPS	n/a
Gene ontology
Molecular function	ATP-dependent protein binding; protein binding
Cellular component	melanosome; lysosomal membrane; terminal bouton; plasma membrane; clathrin-sculpted gamma-aminobutyric acid transport vesicle membrane; extracellular exosome; mitochondrion; synaptic vesicle; membrane; azurophil granule membrane; specific granule membrane; neuromuscular junction; presynapse; anchored component of synaptic vesicle membrane
Biological process	negative regulation of neuron apoptotic process; regulated exocytosis; neurotransmitter secretion; synaptic vesicle exocytosis; exocytosis; neutrophil degranulation; chaperone-mediated protein folding; regulation of synaptic vesicle cycle
Sources:Amigo / QuickGO
Orthologs
Databases	NCBI: entry; OMA: entry
Species	Human	Mouse
Entrez	80331	13002
Ensembl	ENSG00000101152	ENSMUSG00000000826
UniProt	Q9H3Z4	P60904
RefSeq (mRNA)	NM_025219	NM_001271584; NM_001271585; NM_016775
RefSeq (protein)	NP_079495	NP_001258513; NP_001258514; NP_058055
Location (UCSC)	Chr 20: 63.9 – 63.94 Mb	Chr 2: 181.16 – 181.2 Mb
PubMed search
- Wikidata
View/Edit Human	View/Edit Mouse

DnaJ homolog subfamily C member 5, also known as cysteine string protein or CSP, is a protein, that in humans encoded by the DNAJC5 gene. It was first described in 1990.

== Gene ==
In humans, the gene is located on the long arm of chromosome 20 (20q13.33) on the Watson (positive strand). The gene is 40,867 bases in length and the encoded protein has 198 amino acids with a predicted molecular weight of 22.149 kilodaltons (kDa). The weight of the mature protein is 34 kDa.

This gene is highly conserved and found both in invertebrates and vertebrates. In humans, a pseudogene of this gene is located on the short arm of chromosome 8.

== Structure ==
The organisation of the protein is as follows:

- an N-terminus phosphorylation site for protein kinase A
- a J domain (~70 amino acids)
- a linker region
- a cysteine motif consisting of 13–15 cysteines within a stretch of 25 amino acids. It is heavily palmitoylated in the cysteine string motif.
- a less conserved C-terminal domain

== Tissue distribution ==
This protein is abundant in neural tissue and displays a characteristic localization to synaptic and clathrin coated vesicles. It is also found on secretory vesicles in endocrine, neuroendocrine and exocrine cells. This protein makes up ~1% of the protein content of the synaptic vesicles. DNAJC5 appears to have a role in stimulated exocytosis.

== Function ==
The encoded protein is a member of the J protein family. These proteins function in many cellular processes by regulating the ATPase activity of 70 kDa heat shock proteins (Hsp70). DNAJC5 is a guanine nucleotide exchange factor for G_{α} proteins. CSPα plays a role in membrane trafficking and protein folding, and has been shown to have anti-neurodegenerative properties. It is known to play a role in cystic fibrosis and Huntington's disease.

This protein has been proposed as a key element of the synaptic molecular machinery devoted to the rescue of synaptic proteins that have been unfolded by activity dependent stress. Syntaxin 1A, a plasma membrane SNARE (soluble N-ethylmaleimide-sensitive factor attachment protein receptor) critical for neurotransmission, forms a complex with CSPα, a G protein and an N-type calcium channel. Huntingtin may be able displace both syntaxin 1A and CSPα from N-type channels. CSP interacts with the calcium sensor protein synaptotagmin 9 via its linker domain.

Huntingtin-interacting protein 14, a palmitoyl transferase, is required for exocytosis and targeting of CSP to synaptic vesicles. The palmitoyl residues are transferred to the cysteine residues. If these resides are mutated membrane targeting is reduced or lost. The rat CSP forms a complex with Sgt (SGTA) and Hsc70 (HSPA8) located on the synaptic vesicle surface. This complex functions as an ATP-dependent chaperone that reactivates denatured substrates. Furthermore, the Csp/Sgt/Hsc70 complex appears to be important for maintenance of normal synapses.

Its expression may be increased with the use of lithium. Quercetin promotes formation of stable CSPα-CSPα dimers.

Cysteine-string protein increases the calcium sensitivity of neurotransmitter exocytosis.

== Interactions ==
DNAJC5 has been shown to interact with the cystic fibrosis transmembrane conductance regulator.

== Clinical significance ==
Mutations in this gene may cause neuronal ceroid lipofuscinosis.
