= Infantile neuronal ceroid lipofuscinosis =

- Other names: Santavuori disease, Hagberg-Santavuori disease, Santavuori-Haltia disease, Infantile Finnish type neuronal ceroid lipofuscinosis, Balkan disease
- Specialty: Endocrinology

Infantile neuronal ceroid lipofuscinoses (INCL) or Santavuori disease or Hagberg–Santavuori disease or Santavuori–Haltia disease or Infantile Finnish type neuronal ceroid lipofuscinosis or Balkan disease is a form of NCL and inherited as a recessive autosomal genetic trait. The disorder is progressive, degenerative and fatal, extremely rare worldwide – with approximately 60 official cases reported by 1982.

== Presentation ==
The development of children born with INCL is normal for the first 8–18 months, but will then flounder and start to regress both physically and mentally. Motor skills and speech are lost, and optic atrophy causes blindness. A variety of neurological symptoms, such as epilepsy and myoclonic seizures, appear. The senses of hearing and touch remain unaffected. The average lifespan of an INCL child is 9–11 years.

== Causes ==
It has been associated with palmitoyl-protein thioesterase.

== Treatment ==
Treatment is limited. Drugs can alleviate the symptoms, such as sleep difficulties and epilepsy. Physiotherapy helps affected children retain the ability to remain upright for as long as possible, and prevents some of the pain.

Recent attempts to treat INCL with cystagon have been unsuccessful.

== See also ==
- FAIDD (The Finnish Association on Intellectual and Developmental Disabilities)
