= CLN6 =

Protein-coding gene in humans

Identifiers
- Aliases: CLN6, CLN4A, HsT18960, nclf, ceroid-lipofuscinosis, neuronal 6, late infantile, variant, transmembrane ER protein, CLN6 transmembrane ER protein, CLN6A
- External IDs: OMIM: 606725; MGI: 2159324; HomoloGene: 9898; GeneCards: CLN6; OMA:CLN6 - orthologs

Gene location (Mouse)
Chr.	Chromosome 9 (mouse)
Band	9 B|9 33.89 cM	Start	62,746,067 bp
Band	9 B|9 33.89 cM	End	62,759,288 bp
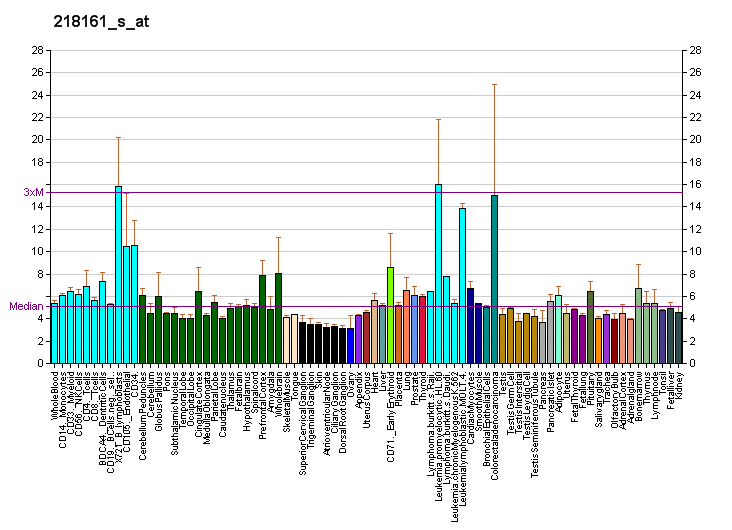
RNA expression pattern
Bgee	Human / Mouse (ortholog); Top expressed in: monocyte; bone marrow; bone marrow cell; rectum; renal cortex; placenta; kidney; islet of Langerhans; blood; appendix / Top expressed in: yolk sac; islet of Langerhans; spermatocyte; lip; seminiferous tubule; muscle of thigh; proximal tubule; right kidney; corneal stroma; neural layer of retina; More reference expression data
BioGPS	More reference expression data
Gene ontology
Molecular function	protein binding; protein homodimerization activity
Cellular component	integral component of membrane; endoplasmic reticulum lumen; endoplasmic reticulum membrane; endoplasmic reticulum; membrane
Biological process	glycosaminoglycan metabolic process; cellular macromolecule catabolic process; lysosomal lumen acidification; ganglioside metabolic process; cholesterol metabolic process; protein catabolic process; locomotion involved in locomotory behavior; lysosome organization; visual perception; positive regulation of proteolysis
Sources:Amigo / QuickGO
Orthologs
Species	Human	Mouse
Entrez	54982	76524
Ensembl	n/a	ENSMUSG00000032245
UniProt	Q9NWW5	n/a
RefSeq (mRNA)	NM_017882	NM_001033175
RefSeq (protein)	NP_060352	n/a
Location (UCSC)	n/a	Chr 9: 62.75 – 62.76 Mb
PubMed search
- Wikidata
View/Edit Human	View/Edit Mouse

Ceroid-lipofuscinosis neuronal protein 6 is a protein that in humans is encoded by the CLN6 gene.

The CLN6 protein is part of the EGRESS complex (ER-to-Golgi relaying of enzymes of the lysosomal system), which recruits lysosomal enzymes at the endoplasmic reticulum to promote their transfer to the Golgi complex. The EGRESS complex is composed of CLN6 and CLN8 proteins. Loss-of-function mutations in CLN6 result in inefficient export of lysosomal enzymes from the endoplasmic reticulum and diminished levels of the enzymes at the lysosome.

== See also ==
- Batten disease
