= PPT1 =

Protein-coding gene in humans

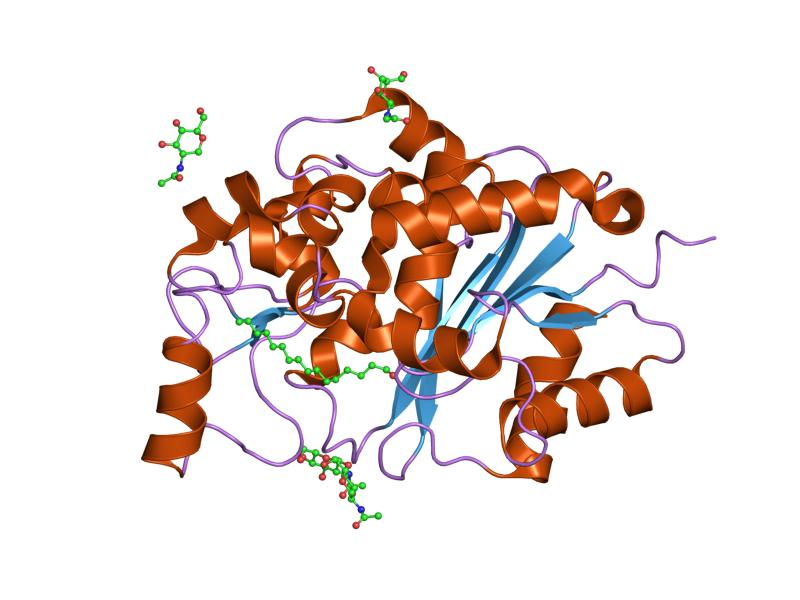

Identifiers
- Aliases: PPT1, CLN1, INCL, PPT, palmitoyl-protein thioesterase 1
- External IDs: OMIM: 600722; MGI: 1298204; GeneCards: PPT1
Available structures
PDB	Ortholog search: PDBe RCSB
PDB	List of PDB id codes 3GRO
Enzyme activity
EC #	BRENDA	ExPASy	KEGG	MetaCyc
3.1.2.2	↗	↗	↗	↗
3.1.2.22	↗	↗	↗	↗

Gene location (Human)
Chr.	Chromosome 1 (human)
Band	1p34.2	Start	40,072,710 bp
Band	1p34.2	End	40,097,260 bp

Gene location (Mouse)
Chr.	Chromosome 4 (mouse)
Band	4 D2.2|4 57.27 cM	Start	122,730,035 bp
Band	4 D2.2|4 57.27 cM	End	122,752,968 bp
RNA expression pattern
Bgee	Human / Mouse (ortholog); Top expressed in: monocyte; lateral nuclear group of thalamus; retinal pigment epithelium; external globus pallidus; pons; granulocyte; parotid gland; pars compacta; blood; pars reticulata / Top expressed in: medial vestibular nucleus; deep cerebellar nuclei; seminiferous tubule; right kidney; pontine nuclei; dorsal tegmental nucleus; cerebellar cortex; median eminence; globus pallidus; arcuate nucleus; More reference expression data
BioGPS	n/a
Gene ontology
Molecular function	palmitoyl-CoA hydrolase activity; palmitoyl hydrolase activity; hydrolase activity; palmitoyl-(protein) hydrolase activity; protein binding
Cellular component	cytosol; Golgi apparatus; membrane; lysosomal lumen; membrane raft; lysosome; extracellular exosome; nucleus; extracellular region; synaptic vesicle; axon; extracellular space; dendrite; neuron projection; soma; synapse
Biological process	negative regulation of neuron apoptotic process; positive regulation of pinocytosis; positive regulation of receptor-mediated endocytosis; lysosomal lumen acidification; response to stimulus; neuron development; negative regulation of apoptotic process; receptor-mediated endocytosis; nervous system development; lipid catabolic process; brain development; membrane raft organization; protein catabolic process; sphingolipid catabolic process; negative regulation of cell growth; protein transport; protein depalmitoylation; pinocytosis; regulation of synapse structure or activity; visual perception; fatty-acyl-CoA biosynthetic process; chemical synaptic transmission; lysosome organization; neurotransmitter secretion; grooming behavior; associative learning; adult locomotory behavior; regulation of phospholipase A2 activity; cellular macromolecule catabolic process
Sources:Amigo / QuickGO
Orthologs
Databases	NCBI: entry; OMA: entry
Species	Human	Mouse
Entrez	5538	19063
Ensembl	ENSG00000131238	ENSMUSG00000028657
UniProt	P50897	O88531
RefSeq (mRNA)	NM_000310; NM_001142604; NM_001363695	NM_008917
RefSeq (protein)	NP_000301; NP_001136076; NP_001350624	NP_032943
Location (UCSC)	Chr 1: 40.07 – 40.1 Mb	Chr 4: 122.73 – 122.75 Mb
PubMed search
- Wikidata
View/Edit Human	View/Edit Mouse

Palmitoyl-protein thioesterase 1 (PPT-1), also known as palmitoyl-protein hydrolase 1, is an enzyme that in humans is encoded by the PPT1 gene.

== Function ==
PPT-1 a member of the palmitoyl protein thioesterase family. PPT-1 is a small glycoprotein involved in the catabolism of lipid-modified proteins during lysosomal degradation. This enzyme removes thioester-linked fatty acyl groups such as palmitate from cysteine residues.

== Clinical significance ==
Defects in this gene are a cause of neuronal ceroid lipofuscinosis type 1 (CLN1).
