= Battenin =

Protein found in humans

CLN3

Identifiers
- Aliases: CLN3, BTS, JNCL, ceroid-lipofuscinosis, neuronal 3, battenin, BTN1, CLN3 lysosomal/endosomal transmembrane protein, battenin
- External IDs: OMIM: 607042; MGI: 107537; GeneCards: CLN3

Gene location (Human)
Chr.	Chromosome 16 (human)
Band	16p12.1	Start	28,474,111 bp
Band	16p12.1	End	28,495,575 bp

Gene location (Mouse)
Chr.	Chromosome 7 (mouse)
Band	7 F3|7 69.16 cM	Start	126,571,207 bp
Band	7 F3|7 69.16 cM	End	126,585,817 bp
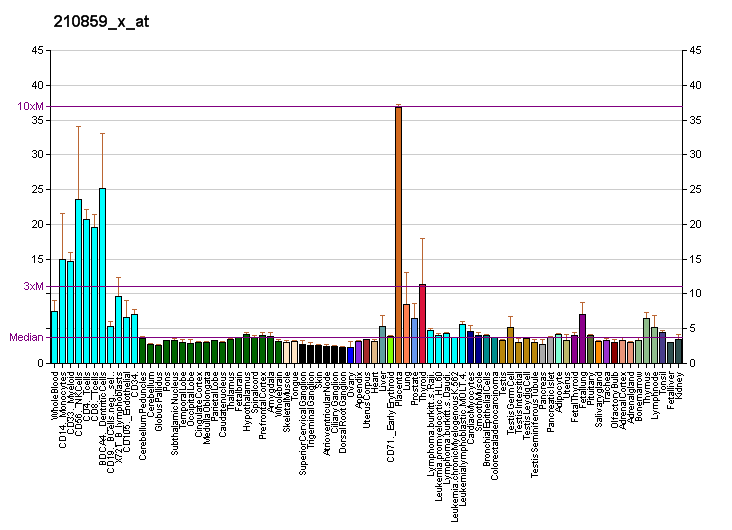

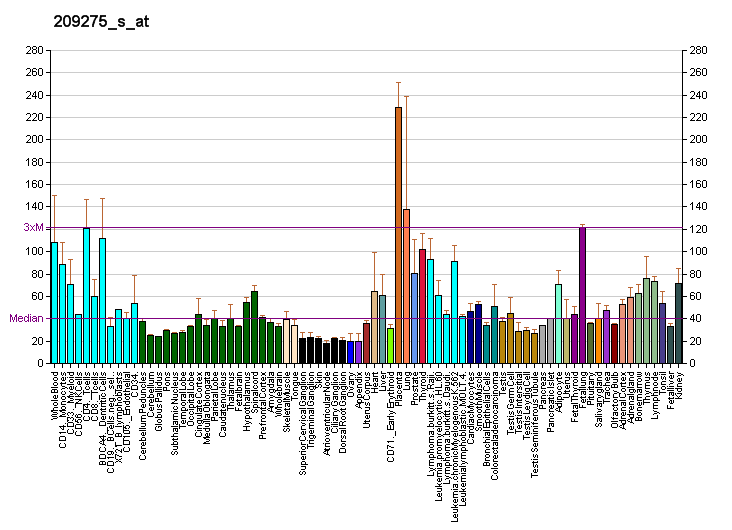
RNA expression pattern
Bgee	Human / Mouse (ortholog); Top expressed in: mucosa of transverse colon; placenta; granulocyte; blood; monocyte; epithelium of colon; rectum; right adrenal cortex; left adrenal gland; right lobe of thyroid gland / Top expressed in: granulocyte; neural layer of retina; morula; yolk sac; lip; right kidney; zygote; choroid plexus of fourth ventricle; blastocyst; internal carotid artery; More reference expression data
BioGPS	More reference expression data
Gene ontology
Molecular function	unfolded protein binding; protein binding
Cellular component	cytoplasm; integral component of membrane; endosome; late endosome; Golgi apparatus; membrane; synaptic vesicle; Golgi membrane; plasma membrane; autophagosome; lysosomal membrane; integral component of endoplasmic reticulum membrane; trans-Golgi network; early endosome; endoplasmic reticulum; mitochondrion; caveola; membrane raft; neuron projection; Golgi stack; lysosome; nucleus
Biological process	negative regulation of neuron apoptotic process; negative regulation of proteolysis; lysosomal lumen acidification; negative regulation of catalytic activity; galactosylceramide metabolic process; associative learning; regulation of cytosolic calcium ion concentration; neuromuscular process controlling balance; ceramide metabolic process; vesicle transport along microtubule; cellular amino acid metabolic process; neurotransmitter metabolic process; protein processing; negative regulation of apoptotic process; receptor-mediated endocytosis; lysosomal lumen pH elevation; globoside metabolic process; glucosylceramide metabolic process; autophagosome maturation; protein catabolic process; ionotropic glutamate receptor signaling pathway; action potential; membrane organization; lysosome organization; macroautophagy; amyloid precursor protein catabolic process; sphingomyelin metabolic process; vacuolar transport; transport; regulation of intracellular pH
Sources:Amigo / QuickGO
Orthologs
Databases	NCBI: entry; OMA: entry
Species	Human	Mouse
Entrez	1201	12752
Ensembl	ENSG00000188603	ENSMUSG00000030720
UniProt	Q13286	Q61124
RefSeq (mRNA)	NM_001286110; NM_000086; NM_001042432; NM_001286104; NM_001286105 NM_001286109	NM_001146311; NM_009907; NM_001329789
RefSeq (protein)	NP_000077; NP_001035897; NP_001273033; NP_001273034; NP_001273038 NP_001273039	NP_001139783; NP_001316718; NP_034037; NP_001389644; NP_001389645 NP_001389646; NP_001389647; NP_001389648; NP_001389649; NP_001389650; NP_001389651
Location (UCSC)	Chr 16: 28.47 – 28.5 Mb	Chr 7: 126.57 – 126.59 Mb
PubMed search
- Wikidata
View/Edit Human	View/Edit Mouse

Battenin is a protein that in humans is encoded by the CLN3 gene located on chromosome 16. Battenin is not clustered into any Pfam clan, but it is included in the TCDB suggesting that it is a transporter. In humans, it belongs to the atypical SLCs due to its structural and phylogenetic similarity to other SLC transporters.

== Function ==
Battenin is involved in lysosomal function. Many alternatively spliced transcript variants have been found for this gene.

Battenin is a transmembrane protein predicted to be composed of 11 transmembrane helices, yet no crystal structure is available.

== Clinical significance ==
Mutations in this gene, as well as other neuronal ceroid-lipofuscinosis (CLN) genes, cause neurodegenerative diseases commonly known as Batten disease, also known as Juvenile Neuronal Ceroid Lipofuscinosis (JNCL) or Juvenile Batten disease.
