= CLN8 =

Protein-coding gene in humans

Identifiers
- Aliases: CLN8, C8orf61, EPMR, ceroid-lipofuscinosis, neuronal 8, transmembrane ER and ERGIC protein, CLN8 transmembrane ER and ERGIC protein, TLCD6
- External IDs: OMIM: 607837; MGI: 1349447; GeneCards: CLN8

Gene location (Human)
Chr.	Chromosome 8 (human)
Band	8p23.3	Start	1,755,778 bp
Band	8p23.3	End	1,801,711 bp

Gene location (Mouse)
Chr.	Chromosome 8 (mouse)
Band	8 A1.1|8 7.59 cM	Start	14,931,335 bp
Band	8 A1.1|8 7.59 cM	End	14,951,720 bp
RNA expression pattern
Bgee	Human / Mouse (ortholog); Top expressed in: corpus callosum; C1 segment; stromal cell of endometrium; monocyte; placenta; substantia nigra; tonsil; skin of leg; liver; skin of abdomen / Top expressed in: lip; cumulus cell; motor neuron; esophagus; umbilical cord; blastocyst; epithelium of small intestine; iris; blastocyst; medullary collecting duct; More reference expression data
BioGPS	n/a
Orthologs
Databases	NCBI: entry; OMA: entry
Species	Human	Mouse
Entrez	2055	26889
Ensembl	ENSG00000182372; ENSG00000278220	ENSMUSG00000026317
UniProt	Q9UBY8	Q9QUK3
RefSeq (mRNA)	NM_001034061; NM_018941	NM_012000
RefSeq (protein)	NP_061764	NP_036130
Location (UCSC)	Chr 8: 1.76 – 1.8 Mb	Chr 8: 14.93 – 14.95 Mb
PubMed search
- Wikidata
View/Edit Human	View/Edit Mouse

Protein CLN8 is a protein that in humans is encoded by the CLN8 gene.

== Molecular biology ==
This gene encodes a transmembrane protein that localizes to the endoplasmic reticulum (ER) and recycles between the ER and the Golgi apparatus via COPII- and COPI-coated vesicles. CLN8 protein functions as a cargo receptor for lysosomal soluble proteins in the ER. CLN8 proteins pair with CLN6 proteins to form the EGRESS complex (ER-to-Golgi relaying of enzymes of the lysosomal system), the functional unit responsible for the export of lysosomal enzymes from the endoplasmic reticulum.

== Clinical ==
Mutations in this gene are associated with progressive epilepsy with mental retardation (EPMR), a subtype of neuronal ceroid lipofuscinosis (NCL). Patients with mutations in this gene have altered levels of sphingolipid and phospholipids in the brain.
