= List of MeSH codes (C18) =

The following is a partial list of the "C" codes for Medical Subject Headings (MeSH), as defined by the United States National Library of Medicine (NLM).

This list continues the information at List of MeSH codes (C17). Codes following these are found at List of MeSH codes (C19). For other MeSH codes, see List of MeSH codes.

The source for this content is the set of 2006 MeSH Trees from the NLM.

== MeSH C18 – nutritional and metabolic diseases ==
=== MeSH C18.452 – metabolic diseases ===
==== MeSH C18.452.076 – acid-base imbalance ====
- MeSH C18.452.076.087 – achlorhydria
- MeSH C18.452.076.176 – acidosis
- MeSH C18.452.076.176.180 – acidosis, lactic
- MeSH C18.452.076.176.210 – acidosis, renal tubular
- MeSH C18.452.076.176.310 – acidosis, respiratory
- MeSH C18.452.076.176.390 – diabetic ketoacidosis
- MeSH C18.452.076.176.652 – ketosis
- MeSH C18.452.076.354 – alkalosis
- MeSH C18.452.076.354.271 – alkalosis, respiratory

==== MeSH C18.452.090 – amyloidosis ====
- MeSH C18.452.090.050 – amyloid neuropathies
- MeSH C18.452.090.050.050 – amyloid neuropathies, familial
- MeSH C18.452.090.075 – amyloidosis, familial
- MeSH C18.452.090.075.050 – amyloid neuropathies, familial
- MeSH C18.452.090.075.160 – cerebral amyloid angiopathy, familial
- MeSH C18.452.090.100 – cerebral amyloid angiopathy
- MeSH C18.452.090.100.160 – cerebral amyloid angiopathy, familial

==== MeSH C18.452.100 – brain diseases, metabolic ====
- MeSH C18.452.100.100 – brain diseases, metabolic, inborn
- MeSH C18.452.100.100.050 – abetalipoproteinemia
- MeSH C18.452.100.100.162 – carbamoyl-phosphate synthase I deficiency disease
- MeSH C18.452.100.100.175 – citrullinemia
- MeSH C18.452.100.100.320 – galactosemias
- MeSH C18.452.100.100.355 – Hartnup disease
- MeSH C18.452.100.100.360 – hepatolenticular degeneration
- MeSH C18.452.100.100.365 – homocystinuria
- MeSH C18.452.100.100.370 – hyperargininemia
- MeSH C18.452.100.100.375 – hyperglycinemia, nonketotic
- MeSH C18.452.100.100.380 – hyperlysinemias
- MeSH C18.452.100.100.412 – Leigh disease
- MeSH C18.452.100.100.425 – Lesch–Nyhan syndrome
- MeSH C18.452.100.100.435 – lysosomal storage diseases, nervous system
- MeSH C18.452.100.100.435.295 – fucosidosis
- MeSH C18.452.100.100.435.340 – glycogen storage disease type II
- MeSH C18.452.100.100.435.590 – mucolipidoses
- MeSH C18.452.100.100.435.810 – sialic acid storage disease
- MeSH C18.452.100.100.435.825 – sphingolipidoses
- MeSH C18.452.100.100.435.825.200 – fabry disease
- MeSH C18.452.100.100.435.825.300 – gangliosidoses
- MeSH C18.452.100.100.435.825.300.300 – gangliosidoses GM2
- MeSH C18.452.100.100.435.825.300.300.800 – Sandhoff disease
- MeSH C18.452.100.100.435.825.300.300.840 – Tay–Sachs disease
- MeSH C18.452.100.100.435.825.300.300.920 – Tay–Sachs disease, AB variant
- MeSH C18.452.100.100.435.825.300.400 – gangliosidosis gm1
- MeSH C18.452.100.100.435.825.400 – Gaucher disease
- MeSH C18.452.100.100.435.825.590 – leukodystrophy, globoid cell
- MeSH C18.452.100.100.435.825.594 – leukodystrophy, metachromatic
- MeSH C18.452.100.100.435.825.700 – Niemann–Pick diseases
- MeSH C18.452.100.100.520 – maple syrup urine disease
- MeSH C18.452.100.100.535 – MELAS syndrome
- MeSH C18.452.100.100.540 – Menkes kinky hair syndrome
- MeSH C18.452.100.100.545 – MERRF syndrome
- MeSH C18.452.100.100.640 – oculocerebrorenal syndrome
- MeSH C18.452.100.100.650 – ornithine carbamoyltransferase deficiency disease
- MeSH C18.452.100.100.680 – peroxisomal disorders
- MeSH C18.452.100.100.680.100 – adrenoleukodystrophy
- MeSH C18.452.100.100.680.760 – Refsum disease
- MeSH C18.452.100.100.680.970 – Zellweger syndrome
- MeSH C18.452.100.100.687 – phenylketonurias
- MeSH C18.452.100.100.687.500 – phenylketonuria, maternal
- MeSH C18.452.100.100.725 – pyruvate carboxylase deficiency disease
- MeSH C18.452.100.100.750 – pyruvate dehydrogenase complex deficiency disease
- MeSH C18.452.100.100.875 – tyrosinemias
- MeSH C18.452.100.360 – hepatic encephalopathy
- MeSH C18.452.100.480 – kernicterus
- MeSH C18.452.100.540 – mitochondrial encephalomyopathies
- MeSH C18.452.100.560 – myelinolysis, central pontine
- MeSH C18.452.100.780 – Reye syndrome
- MeSH C18.452.100.960 – Wernicke encephalopathy

==== MeSH C18.452.174 – calcium metabolism disorders ====
- MeSH C18.452.174.130 – calcinosis
- MeSH C18.452.174.130.186 – calciphylaxis
- MeSH C18.452.174.130.204 – CREST syndrome
- MeSH C18.452.174.130.560 – nephrocalcinosis
- MeSH C18.452.174.289 – decalcification, pathologic
- MeSH C18.452.174.451 – hypercalcemia
- MeSH C18.452.174.509 – hypocalcemia
- MeSH C18.452.174.509.700 – tetany
- MeSH C18.452.174.662 – osteomalacia
- MeSH C18.452.174.766 – pseudohypoparathyroidism
- MeSH C18.452.174.766.815 – pseudopseudohypoparathyroidism
- MeSH C18.452.174.845 – rickets

==== MeSH C18.452.284 – DNA repair-deficiency disorders ====
- MeSH C18.452.284.060 – ataxia–telangiectasia
- MeSH C18.452.284.100 – Bloom syndrome
- MeSH C18.452.284.250 – Cockayne syndrome
- MeSH C18.452.284.255 – colorectal neoplasms, hereditary nonpolyposis
- MeSH C18.452.284.280 – fanconi anemia
- MeSH C18.452.284.520 – Li–Fraumeni syndrome
- MeSH C18.452.284.600 – Nijmegen breakage syndrome
- MeSH C18.452.284.760 – Rothmund–Thomson syndrome
- MeSH C18.452.284.800 – severe combined immunodeficiency
- MeSH C18.452.284.960 – Werner syndrome
- MeSH C18.452.284.975 – xeroderma pigmentosum

==== MeSH C18.452.339 – dyslipidemias ====
- MeSH C18.452.339.500 – hyperlipidemia
- MeSH C18.452.339.500.396 – hypercholesterolemia
- MeSH C18.452.339.500.396.300 – hypercholesterolemia, familial
- MeSH C18.452.339.500.438 – hyperlipidemia, familial combined
- MeSH C18.452.339.500.438.390 – hypercholesterolemia, familial
- MeSH C18.452.339.500.438.395 – hyperlipoproteinemia type IV
- MeSH C18.452.339.500.851 – hypertriglyceridemia
- MeSH C18.452.339.750 – hyperlipoproteinemia
- MeSH C18.452.339.750.475 – hypercholesterolemia, familial
- MeSH C18.452.339.750.485 – hyperlipoproteinemia type III
- MeSH C18.452.339.750.490 – hyperlipoproteinemia type IV
- MeSH C18.452.339.750.495 – hyperlipoproteinemia type V
- MeSH C18.452.339.750.552 – lipoprotein lipase deficiency, familial
- MeSH C18.452.339.875 – hypolipoproteinemia
- MeSH C18.452.339.875.220 – abetalipoproteinemia
- MeSH C18.452.339.875.440 – hypobetalipoproteinemia
- MeSH C18.452.339.875.448 – lecithin acyltransferase deficiency
- MeSH C18.452.339.875.724 – tangier disease

==== MeSH C18.452.394 – glucose metabolism disorders ====
- MeSH C18.452.394.750 – diabetes mellitus
- MeSH C18.452.394.750.074 – diabetes mellitus, experimental
- MeSH C18.452.394.750.124 – diabetes mellitus, type 1
- MeSH C18.452.394.750.124.960 – wolfram syndrome
- MeSH C18.452.394.750.149 – diabetes mellitus, type 2
- MeSH C18.452.394.750.149.500 – diabetes mellitus, lipoatrophic
- MeSH C18.452.394.750.448 – diabetes, gestational
- MeSH C18.452.394.750.535 – diabetic ketoacidosis
- MeSH C18.452.394.750.774 – prediabetic state
- MeSH C18.452.394.937 – glycosuria
- MeSH C18.452.394.937.450 – glycosuria, renal
- MeSH C18.452.394.952 – hyperglycemia
- MeSH C18.452.394.952.500 – glucose intolerance
- MeSH C18.452.394.968 – hyperinsulinism
- MeSH C18.452.394.968.500 – insulin resistance
- MeSH C18.452.394.968.500.570 – metabolic syndrome x
- MeSH C18.452.394.968.750 – persistent hyperinsulinemia hypoglycemia of infancy
- MeSH C18.452.394.984 – hypoglycemia
- MeSH C18.452.394.984.492 – insulin coma
- MeSH C18.452.394.984.746 – persistent hyperinsulinemia hypoglycemia of infancy

==== MeSH C18.452.429 – hyperbilirubinemia ====
- MeSH C18.452.429.124 – hyperbilirubinemia, neonatal
- MeSH C18.452.429.124.500 – jaundice, neonatal
- MeSH C18.452.429.500 – kernicterus

==== MeSH C18.452.497 – hyperoxaluria ====
- MeSH C18.452.497.490 – hyperoxaluria, primary

==== MeSH C18.452.565 – iron metabolism disorders ====
- MeSH C18.452.565.100 – anemia, iron-deficiency
- MeSH C18.452.565.500 – iron overload
- MeSH C18.452.565.500.480 – hemochromatosis
- MeSH C18.452.565.500.500 – hemosiderosis

==== MeSH C18.452.603 – malabsorption syndromes ====
- MeSH C18.452.603.145 – blind loop syndrome
- MeSH C18.452.603.250 – celiac disease
- MeSH C18.452.603.506 – lactose intolerance
- MeSH C18.452.603.850 – sprue, tropical
- MeSH C18.452.603.887 – steatorrhea
- MeSH C18.452.603.925 – whipple disease

==== MeSH C18.452.648 – metabolism, inborn errors ====
- MeSH C18.452.648.066 – amino acid metabolism, inborn errors
- MeSH C18.452.648.066.102 – albinism
- MeSH C18.452.648.066.102.090 – albinism, ocular
- MeSH C18.452.648.066.102.100 – albinism, oculocutaneous
- MeSH C18.452.648.066.102.100.400 – Hermansky–Pudlak syndrome
- MeSH C18.452.648.066.102.600 – piebaldism
- MeSH C18.452.648.066.187 – alkaptonuria
- MeSH C18.452.648.066.210 – aminoaciduria, renal
- MeSH C18.452.648.066.210.250 – cystinuria
- MeSH C18.452.648.066.210.490 – Hartnup disease
- MeSH C18.452.648.066.275 – carbamoyl phosphate synthase I deficiency disease
- MeSH C18.452.648.066.340 – citrullinemia
- MeSH C18.452.648.066.470 – homocystinuria
- MeSH C18.452.648.066.475 – hyperargininemia
- MeSH C18.452.648.066.477 – hyperglycinemia, nonketotic
- MeSH C18.452.648.066.480 – hyperhomocysteinemia
- MeSH C18.452.648.066.544 – hyperlysinemias
- MeSH C18.452.648.066.608 – maple syrup urine disease
- MeSH C18.452.648.066.620 – multiple carboxylase deficiency
- MeSH C18.452.648.066.620.100 – biotinidase deficiency
- MeSH C18.452.648.066.620.380 – holocarboxylase synthetase deficiency
- MeSH C18.452.648.066.729 – ornithine carbamoyltransferase deficiency disease
- MeSH C18.452.648.066.766 – phenylketonurias
- MeSH C18.452.648.066.766.500 – phenylketonuria, maternal
- MeSH C18.452.648.066.880 – tyrosinemias
- MeSH C18.452.648.088 – amino acid transport disorders, inborn
- MeSH C18.452.648.088.400 – hartnup disease
- MeSH C18.452.648.088.600 – oculocerebrorenal syndrome
- MeSH C18.452.648.100 – amyloidosis, familial
- MeSH C18.452.648.100.050 – amyloid neuropathies, familial
- MeSH C18.452.648.100.160 – cerebral amyloid angiopathy, familial
- MeSH C18.452.648.151 – brain diseases, metabolic, inborn
- MeSH C18.452.648.151.050 – abetalipoproteinemia
- MeSH C18.452.648.151.162 – carbamoyl-phosphate synthase i deficiency disease
- MeSH C18.452.648.151.168 – cerebral amyloid angiopathy, familial
- MeSH C18.452.648.151.175 – citrullinemia
- MeSH C18.452.648.151.300 – fucosidosis
- MeSH C18.452.648.151.320 – galactosemias
- MeSH C18.452.648.151.330 – glycogen storage disease type II
- MeSH C18.452.648.151.355 – hartnup disease
- MeSH C18.452.648.151.360 – hepatolenticular degeneration
- MeSH C18.452.648.151.365 – homocystinuria
- MeSH C18.452.648.151.370 – hyperargininemia
- MeSH C18.452.648.151.375 – hyperglycinemia, nonketotic
- MeSH C18.452.648.151.380 – hyperlysinemias
- MeSH C18.452.648.151.412 – Leigh disease
- MeSH C18.452.648.151.425 – Lesch–Nyhan syndrome
- MeSH C18.452.648.151.435 – lysosomal storage diseases, nervous system
- MeSH C18.452.648.151.435.295 – fucosidosis
- MeSH C18.452.648.151.435.340 – glycogen storage disease type II
- MeSH C18.452.648.151.435.590 – mucolipidoses
- MeSH C18.452.648.151.435.810 – sialic acid storage disease
- MeSH C18.452.648.151.435.825 – sphingolipidoses
- MeSH C18.452.648.151.435.825.200 – Fabry disease
- MeSH C18.452.648.151.435.825.300 – gangliosidoses
- MeSH C18.452.648.151.435.825.300.300 – gangliosidoses GM2
- MeSH C18.452.648.151.435.825.300.300.800 – Sandhoff disease
- MeSH C18.452.648.151.435.825.300.300.840 – Tay–Sachs disease
- MeSH C18.452.648.151.435.825.300.300.920 – Tay–Sachs disease, AB variant
- MeSH C18.452.648.151.435.825.300.400 – gangliosidosis gm1
- MeSH C18.452.648.151.435.825.400 – Gaucher disease
- MeSH C18.452.648.151.435.825.590 – leukodystrophy, globoid cell
- MeSH C18.452.648.151.435.825.594 – leukodystrophy, metachromatic
- MeSH C18.452.648.151.435.825.700 – Niemann–Pick diseases
- MeSH C18.452.648.151.445 – maple syrup urine disease
- MeSH C18.452.648.151.447 – MELAS syndrome
- MeSH C18.452.648.151.450 – menkes kinky hair syndrome
- MeSH C18.452.648.151.505 – MERRF syndrome
- MeSH C18.452.648.151.580 – mucolipidoses
- MeSH C18.452.648.151.640 – oculocerebrorenal syndrome
- MeSH C18.452.648.151.650 – ornithine carbamoyltransferase deficiency disease
- MeSH C18.452.648.151.680 – peroxisomal disorders
- MeSH C18.452.648.151.680.100 – adrenoleukodystrophy
- MeSH C18.452.648.151.680.760 – refsum disease
- MeSH C18.452.648.151.680.970 – Zellweger syndrome
- MeSH C18.452.648.151.687 – phenylketonurias
- MeSH C18.452.648.151.687.500 – phenylketonuria, maternal
- MeSH C18.452.648.151.725 – pyruvate carboxylase deficiency disease
- MeSH C18.452.648.151.750 – pyruvate dehydrogenase complex deficiency disease
- MeSH C18.452.648.151.825 – sphingolipidoses
- MeSH C18.452.648.151.825.200 – Fabry disease
- MeSH C18.452.648.151.825.300 – gangliosidoses
- MeSH C18.452.648.151.825.300.300 – gangliosidoses gm2
- MeSH C18.452.648.151.825.300.300.700 – Sandhoff disease
- MeSH C18.452.648.151.825.300.300.850 – Tay–Sachs disease
- MeSH C18.452.648.151.825.300.300.925 – Tay–Sachs disease, AB variant
- MeSH C18.452.648.151.825.300.400 – gangliosidosis gm1
- MeSH C18.452.648.151.825.400 – Gaucher disease
- MeSH C18.452.648.151.825.590 – leukodystrophy, globoid cell
- MeSH C18.452.648.151.825.594 – leukodystrophy, metachromatic
- MeSH C18.452.648.151.825.700 – Niemann–Pick diseases
- MeSH C18.452.648.151.875 – tyrosinemias
- MeSH C18.452.648.202 – carbohydrate metabolism, inborn errors
- MeSH C18.452.648.202.125 – carbohydrate-deficient glycoprotein syndrome
- MeSH C18.452.648.202.251 – fructose metabolism, inborn errors
- MeSH C18.452.648.202.251.221 – fructose-1,6-diphosphatase deficiency
- MeSH C18.452.648.202.251.271 – Hereditary fructose intolerance
- MeSH C18.452.648.202.303 – fucosidosis
- MeSH C18.452.648.202.355 – galactosemias
- MeSH C18.452.648.202.449 – glycogen storage disease
- MeSH C18.452.648.202.449.448 – glycogen storage disease type I
- MeSH C18.452.648.202.449.500 – glycogen storage disease type II
- MeSH C18.452.648.202.449.510 – glycogen storage disease type IIb
- MeSH C18.452.648.202.449.520 – glycogen storage disease type III
- MeSH C18.452.648.202.449.540 – glycogen storage disease type IV
- MeSH C18.452.648.202.449.560 – glycogen storage disease type V
- MeSH C18.452.648.202.449.580 – glycogen storage disease type VI
- MeSH C18.452.648.202.449.600 – glycogen storage disease type VII
- MeSH C18.452.648.202.449.620 – glycogen storage disease type VIII
- MeSH C18.452.648.202.460 – hyperoxaluria, primary
- MeSH C18.452.648.202.589 – lactose intolerance
- MeSH C18.452.648.202.607 – mannosidase deficiency diseases
- MeSH C18.452.648.202.607.500 – alpha-mannosidosis
- MeSH C18.452.648.202.607.750 – beta-mannosidosis
- MeSH C18.452.648.202.670 – mucolipidoses
- MeSH C18.452.648.202.715 – mucopolysaccharidoses
- MeSH C18.452.648.202.715.640 – mucopolysaccharidosis I
- MeSH C18.452.648.202.715.645 – mucopolysaccharidosis II
- MeSH C18.452.648.202.715.650 – mucopolysaccharidosis III
- MeSH C18.452.648.202.715.655 – mucopolysaccharidosis IV
- MeSH C18.452.648.202.715.670 – mucopolysaccharidosis VI
- MeSH C18.452.648.202.715.675 – mucopolysaccharidosis VII
- MeSH C18.452.648.202.720 – multiple carboxylase deficiency
- MeSH C18.452.648.202.720.100 – biotinidase deficiency
- MeSH C18.452.648.202.720.380 – holocarboxylase synthetase deficiency
- MeSH C18.452.648.202.810 – pyruvate metabolism, inborn errors
- MeSH C18.452.648.202.810.444 – Leigh disease
- MeSH C18.452.648.202.810.666 – pyruvate carboxylase deficiency disease
- MeSH C18.452.648.202.810.766 – pyruvate dehydrogenase complex deficiency disease
- MeSH C18.452.648.240 – cytochrome-c oxidase deficiency
- MeSH C18.452.648.390 – glucosephosphate dehydrogenase deficiency
- MeSH C18.452.648.437 – hyperbilirubinemia, hereditary
- MeSH C18.452.648.437.281 – Crigler–Najjar syndrome
- MeSH C18.452.648.437.528 – gilbert disease
- MeSH C18.452.648.499 – jaundice, chronic idiopathic
- MeSH C18.452.648.556 – lipid metabolism, inborn errors
- MeSH C18.452.648.556.475 – hypercholesterolemia, familial
- MeSH C18.452.648.556.480 – hyperlipidemia, familial combined
- MeSH C18.452.648.556.480.390 – hypercholesterolemia, familial
- MeSH C18.452.648.556.480.395 – hyperlipoproteinemia type IV
- MeSH C18.452.648.556.484 – hyperlipoproteinemia type III
- MeSH C18.452.648.556.490 – hyperlipoproteinemia type IV
- MeSH C18.452.648.556.495 – hyperlipoproteinemia type V
- MeSH C18.452.648.556.500 – hypolipoproteinemia
- MeSH C18.452.648.556.500.220 – abetalipoproteinemia
- MeSH C18.452.648.556.500.440 – hypobetalipoproteinemia
- MeSH C18.452.648.556.500.448 – lecithin acyltransferase deficiency
- MeSH C18.452.648.556.500.724 – Tangier disease
- MeSH C18.452.648.556.641 – lipoidosis
- MeSH C18.452.648.556.641.201 – cholesterol ester storage disease
- MeSH C18.452.648.556.641.391 – lipoidproteinosis
- MeSH C18.452.648.556.641.509 – neuronal ceroid lipofuscinosis
- MeSH C18.452.648.556.641.643 – Refsum disease
- MeSH C18.452.648.556.641.723 – Sjögren–Larsson syndrome
- MeSH C18.452.648.556.641.803 – sphingolipidoses
- MeSH C18.452.648.556.641.803.300 – Fabry disease
- MeSH C18.452.648.556.641.803.350 – gangliosidoses
- MeSH C18.452.648.556.641.803.350.300 – gangliosidoses GM2
- MeSH C18.452.648.556.641.803.350.300.700 – Sandhoff disease
- MeSH C18.452.648.556.641.803.350.300.850 – Tay–Sachs disease
- MeSH C18.452.648.556.641.803.350.300.925 – Tay–Sachs disease, AB variant
- MeSH C18.452.648.556.641.803.350.360 – gangliosidosis gm1
- MeSH C18.452.648.556.641.803.441 – Gaucher disease
- MeSH C18.452.648.556.641.803.585 – leukodystrophy, globoid cell
- MeSH C18.452.648.556.641.803.594 – leukodystrophy, metachromatic
- MeSH C18.452.648.556.641.803.730 – Niemann–Pick diseases
- MeSH C18.452.648.556.641.803.850 – sea-blue histiocyte syndrome
- MeSH C18.452.648.556.641.923 – Wolman disease
- MeSH C18.452.648.556.645 – lipoprotein lipase deficiency, familial
- MeSH C18.452.648.556.750 – peroxisomal disorders
- MeSH C18.452.648.556.750.025 – acatalasia
- MeSH C18.452.648.556.750.112 – adrenoleukodystrophy
- MeSH C18.452.648.556.750.200 – chondrodysplasia punctata, rhizomelic
- MeSH C18.452.648.556.750.760 – Refsum disease
- MeSH C18.452.648.556.750.970 – Zellweger syndrome
- MeSH C18.452.648.556.850 – Smith–Lemli–Opitz syndrome
- MeSH C18.452.648.556.925 – xanthomatosis, cerebrotendinous
- MeSH C18.452.648.595 – lysosomal storage diseases
- MeSH C18.452.648.595.201 – cholesterol ester storage disease
- MeSH C18.452.648.595.554 – lysosomal storage diseases, nervous system
- MeSH C18.452.648.595.554.295 – fucosidosis
- MeSH C18.452.648.595.554.340 – glycogen storage disease type II
- MeSH C18.452.648.595.554.590 – mucolipidoses
- MeSH C18.452.648.595.554.810 – sialic acid storage disease
- MeSH C18.452.648.595.554.825 – sphingolipidoses
- MeSH C18.452.648.595.554.825.200 – Fabry disease
- MeSH C18.452.648.595.554.825.300 – gangliosidoses
- MeSH C18.452.648.595.554.825.300.300 – gangliosidoses GM2
- MeSH C18.452.648.595.554.825.300.300.800 – Sandhoff disease
- MeSH C18.452.648.595.554.825.300.300.840 – Tay–Sachs disease
- MeSH C18.452.648.595.554.825.300.300.920 – Tay–Sachs disease, AB variant
- MeSH C18.452.648.595.554.825.300.400 – gangliosidosis gm1
- MeSH C18.452.648.595.554.825.400 – Gaucher disease
- MeSH C18.452.648.595.554.825.590 – leukodystrophy, globoid cell
- MeSH C18.452.648.595.554.825.594 – leukodystrophy, metachromatic
- MeSH C18.452.648.595.554.825.700 – Niemann–Pick diseases
- MeSH C18.452.648.595.577 – mannosidase deficiency diseases
- MeSH C18.452.648.595.577.500 – alpha-mannosidosis
- MeSH C18.452.648.595.577.750 – beta-mannosidosis
- MeSH C18.452.648.595.600 – mucopolysaccharidoses
- MeSH C18.452.648.595.600.640 – mucopolysaccharidosis I
- MeSH C18.452.648.595.600.645 – mucopolysaccharidosis II
- MeSH C18.452.648.595.600.650 – mucopolysaccharidosis III
- MeSH C18.452.648.595.600.655 – mucopolysaccharidosis IV
- MeSH C18.452.648.595.600.670 – mucopolysaccharidosis VI
- MeSH C18.452.648.595.600.675 – mucopolysaccharidosis VII
- MeSH C18.452.648.595.803 – sphingolipidoses
- MeSH C18.452.648.595.803.300 – Fabry disease
- MeSH C18.452.648.595.803.350 – gangliosidoses
- MeSH C18.452.648.595.803.350.300 – gangliosidoses GM2
- MeSH C18.452.648.595.803.350.300.700 – Sandhoff disease
- MeSH C18.452.648.595.803.350.300.850 – Tay–Sachs disease
- MeSH C18.452.648.595.803.350.300.925 – Tay–Sachs disease, AB variant
- MeSH C18.452.648.595.803.441 – Gaucher disease
- MeSH C18.452.648.595.803.585 – leukodystrophy, globoid cell
- MeSH C18.452.648.595.803.594 – leukodystrophy, metachromatic
- MeSH C18.452.648.595.803.730 – Niemann–Pick diseases
- MeSH C18.452.648.595.803.850 – sea-blue histiocyte syndrome
- MeSH C18.452.648.595.923 – Wolman disease
- MeSH C18.452.648.618 – metal metabolism, inborn errors
- MeSH C18.452.648.618.337 – hemochromatosis
- MeSH C18.452.648.618.403 – hepatolenticular degeneration
- MeSH C18.452.648.618.482 – hypophosphatasia
- MeSH C18.452.648.618.544 – hypophosphatemia, familial
- MeSH C18.452.648.618.590 – Menkes kinky hair syndrome
- MeSH C18.452.648.618.711 – paralyses, familial periodic
- MeSH C18.452.648.618.711.550 – hypokalemic periodic paralysis
- MeSH C18.452.648.618.711.600 – paralysis, hyperkalemic periodic
- MeSH C18.452.648.618.815 – pseudohypoparathyroidism
- MeSH C18.452.648.618.815.815 – pseudopseudohypoparathyroidism
- MeSH C18.452.648.730 – porphyria, erythropoietic
- MeSH C18.452.648.735 – porphyrias, hepatic
- MeSH C18.452.648.735.074 – coproporphyria, hereditary
- MeSH C18.452.648.735.150 – porphyria, acute intermittent
- MeSH C18.452.648.735.250 – porphyria cutanea tarda
- MeSH C18.452.648.735.437 – porphyria, hepatoerythropoietic
- MeSH C18.452.648.735.625 – porphyria, variegate
- MeSH C18.452.648.735.812 – protoporphyria, erythropoietic
- MeSH C18.452.648.769 – progeria
- MeSH C18.452.648.798 – purine–pyrimidine metabolism, inborn errors
- MeSH C18.452.648.798.368 – gout
- MeSH C18.452.648.798.368.410 – arthritis, gouty
- MeSH C18.452.648.798.594 – Lesch–Nyhan syndrome
- MeSH C18.452.648.851 – renal tubular transport, inborn errors
- MeSH C18.452.648.851.093 – acidosis, renal tubular
- MeSH C18.452.648.851.191 – aminoaciduria, renal
- MeSH C18.452.648.851.191.250 – cystinuria
- MeSH C18.452.648.851.191.457 – Hartnup disease
- MeSH C18.452.648.851.368 – cystinosis
- MeSH C18.452.648.851.368.210 – Fanconi syndrome
- MeSH C18.452.648.851.532 – glycosuria, renal
- MeSH C18.452.648.851.647 – hypophosphatemia, familial
- MeSH C18.452.648.851.750 – oculocerebrorenal syndrome
- MeSH C18.452.648.851.770 – pseudohypoaldosteronism
- MeSH C18.452.648.925 – steroid metabolism, inborn errors
- MeSH C18.452.648.925.249 – adrenal hyperplasia, congenital
- MeSH C18.452.648.925.500 – mineralocorticoid excess syndrome, apparent
- MeSH C18.452.648.925.750 – ichthyosis, x-linked
- MeSH C18.452.648.925.875 – Smith–Lemli–Opitz syndrome

==== MeSH C18.452.660 – mitochondrial diseases ====
- MeSH C18.452.660.195 – cytochrome-c oxidase deficiency
- MeSH C18.452.660.300 – Friedreich's ataxia
- MeSH C18.452.660.515 – optic atrophy, hereditary, leber
- MeSH C18.452.660.520 – Leigh disease
- MeSH C18.452.660.560 – mitochondrial myopathies
- MeSH C18.452.660.560.620 – mitochondrial encephalomyopathies
- MeSH C18.452.660.560.620.520 – MELAS syndrome
- MeSH C18.452.660.560.620.530 – MERRF syndrome
- MeSH C18.452.660.560.700 – ophthalmoplegia, chronic progressive external
- MeSH C18.452.660.560.700.500 – Kearns–Sayre syndrome
- MeSH C18.452.660.665 – optic atrophy, autosomal dominant
- MeSH C18.452.660.705 – pyruvate carboxylase deficiency disease
- MeSH C18.452.660.710 – pyruvate dehydrogenase complex deficiency disease

==== MeSH C18.452.750 – phosphorus metabolism disorders ====
- MeSH C18.452.750.400 – hypophosphatemia

==== MeSH C18.452.872 – skin diseases, metabolic ====
- MeSH C18.452.872.077 – adiposis dolorosa
- MeSH C18.452.872.617 – porphyrias
- MeSH C18.452.872.617.250 – porphyria, erythropoietic
- MeSH C18.452.872.617.400 – porphyrias, hepatic
- MeSH C18.452.872.617.400.074 – coproporphyria, hereditary
- MeSH C18.452.872.617.400.150 – porphyria, acute intermittent
- MeSH C18.452.872.617.400.250 – porphyria cutanea tarda
- MeSH C18.452.872.617.400.437 – porphyria, hepatoerythropoietic
- MeSH C18.452.872.617.400.625 – porphyria, variegate
- MeSH C18.452.872.617.400.812 – protoporphyria, erythropoietic
- MeSH C18.452.872.866 – xanthogranuloma, juvenile
- MeSH C18.452.872.929 – xanthomatosis
- MeSH C18.452.872.929.950 – wolman disease
- MeSH C18.452.872.929.975 – xanthomatosis, cerebrotendinous

==== MeSH C18.452.940 – wasting syndrome ====
- MeSH C18.452.940.520 – hiv wasting syndrome

==== MeSH C18.452.950 – water-electrolyte imbalance ====
- MeSH C18.452.950.179 – dehydration
- MeSH C18.452.950.340 – hypercalcemia
- MeSH C18.452.950.396 – hyperkalemia
- MeSH C18.452.950.452 – hypernatremia
- MeSH C18.452.950.509 – hypocalcemia
- MeSH C18.452.950.565 – hypokalemia
- MeSH C18.452.950.620 – hyponatremia
- MeSH C18.452.950.626 – inappropriate adh syndrome
- MeSH C18.452.950.932 – water intoxication

=== MeSH C18.654 – nutrition disorders ===
==== MeSH C18.654.422 – infant nutrition disorders ====
- MeSH C18.654.422.360 – hemorrhagic disease of newborn

==== MeSH C18.654.521 – malnutrition ====
- MeSH C18.654.521.500 – deficiency diseases
- MeSH C18.654.521.500.133 – avitaminosis
- MeSH C18.654.521.500.133.115 – ascorbic acid deficiency
- MeSH C18.654.521.500.133.115.661 – scurvy
- MeSH C18.654.521.500.133.628 – vitamin A deficiency
- MeSH C18.654.521.500.133.699 – vitamin B deficiency
- MeSH C18.654.521.500.133.699.160 – choline deficiency
- MeSH C18.654.521.500.133.699.308 – folic acid deficiency
- MeSH C18.654.521.500.133.699.529 – pellagra
- MeSH C18.654.521.500.133.699.713 – riboflavin deficiency
- MeSH C18.654.521.500.133.699.827 – thiamine deficiency
- MeSH C18.654.521.500.133.699.827.223 – beriberi
- MeSH C18.654.521.500.133.699.827.822 – wernicke encephalopathy
- MeSH C18.654.521.500.133.699.901 – vitamin B6 deficiency
- MeSH C18.654.521.500.133.699.923 – vitamin B12 deficiency
- MeSH C18.654.521.500.133.699.923.280 – anemia, pernicious
- MeSH C18.654.521.500.133.770 – vitamin D deficiency
- MeSH C18.654.521.500.133.770.496 – osteomalacia
- MeSH C18.654.521.500.133.770.734 – rickets
- MeSH C18.654.521.500.133.841 – vitamin E deficiency
- MeSH C18.654.521.500.133.841.682 – steatitis
- MeSH C18.654.521.500.133.912 – vitamin K deficiency
- MeSH C18.654.521.500.133.912.360 – hemorrhagic disease of newborn
- MeSH C18.654.521.500.439 – magnesium deficiency
- MeSH C18.654.521.500.617 – potassium deficiency
- MeSH C18.654.521.500.708 – protein deficiency
- MeSH C18.654.521.500.708.626 – protein-energy malnutrition
- MeSH C18.654.521.500.708.626.505 – kwashiorkor
- MeSH C18.654.521.500.857 – swayback
- MeSH C18.654.521.625 – fetal nutrition disorders
- MeSH C18.654.521.750 – starvation

==== MeSH C18.654.726 – overnutrition ====
- MeSH C18.654.726.500 – obesity
- MeSH C18.654.726.500.695 – obesity hypoventilation syndrome
- MeSH C18.654.726.500.700 – obesity, morbid
- MeSH C18.654.726.500.740 – Prader–Willi syndrome

==== MeSH C18.654.940 – wasting syndrome ====
- MeSH C18.654.940.520 – hiv wasting syndrome

The list continues at List of MeSH codes (C19).
