= History of Tay–Sachs disease =

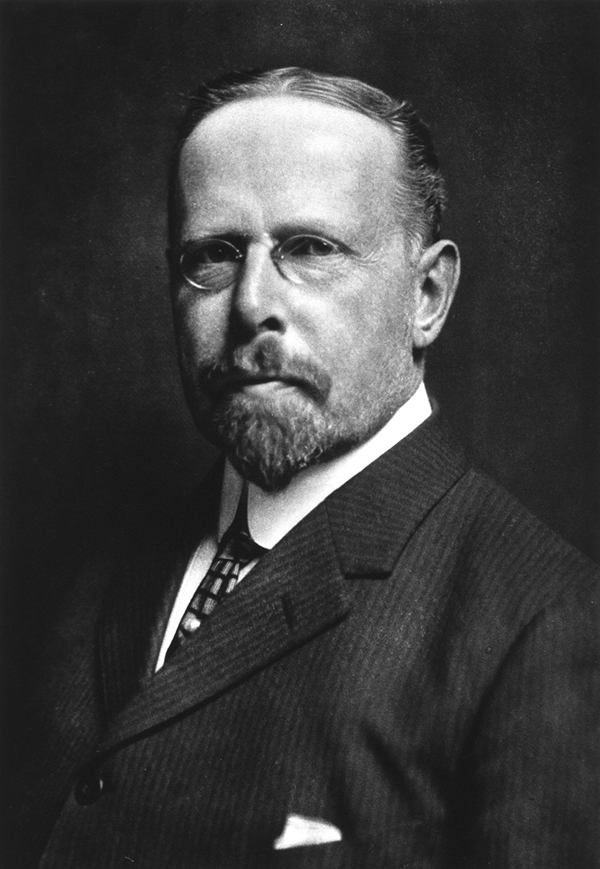
Bernard Sachs, an American neurologist

The history of Tay–Sachs disease started with the development and acceptance of the evolution theory of disease in the 1860s and 1870s, the possibility that science could explain and even prevent or cure illness prompted medical doctors to undertake more precise description and diagnosis of disease. Waren Tay and Bernard Sachs, two physicians of the late 19th century described the progression of the disease precisely and provided differential diagnostic criteria to distinguish it from other neurological disorders with similar symptoms.

Both Tay and Sachs reported their first cases among Jewish families. Tay reported his observations in 1881 in the first volume of the proceedings of the British Ophthalmological Society, of which he was a founding member. By 1884, he had seen three cases in a single family. Years later, Bernard Sachs, an American neurologist, reported similar findings when he reported a case of "arrested cerebral development" to members of the New York Neurological Society.

Sachs, who recognized that the disease had a familial basis, proposed that the disease should be called amaurotic familial idiocy. However, its genetic basis was still poorly understood. Although Gregor Mendel had published his article on the genetics of peas in 1865, Mendel's paper was largely forgotten for more than a generation, not rediscovered by other scientists until 1899. Thus, the Mendelian model for explaining Tay–Sachs was unavailable to scientists and medical practitioners of the time. The first edition of the Jewish Encyclopedia, published in 12 volumes between 1901 and 1906, described what was then known about the disease:

It is a curious fact that amaurotic family idiocy, a rare and fatal disease of children, occurs mostly among Jews. The largest number of cases has been observed in the United States—over thirty in number. It was at first thought that this was an exclusively Jewish disease, because most of the cases at first reported were between Russian and Polish Jews; but recently there have been reported cases occurring in non-Jewish children. The chief characteristics of the disease are progressive mental and physical enfeeblement; weakness and paralysis of all the extremities; and marasmus, associated with symmetrical changes in the macula lutea. On investigation of the reported cases, they found that neither consanguinity nor syphilitic, alcoholic, or nervous antecedents in the family history are factors in the etiology of the disease. No preventive measures have as yet been discovered, and no treatment has been of benefit, all the cases having terminated fatally.

== Eugenics era ==
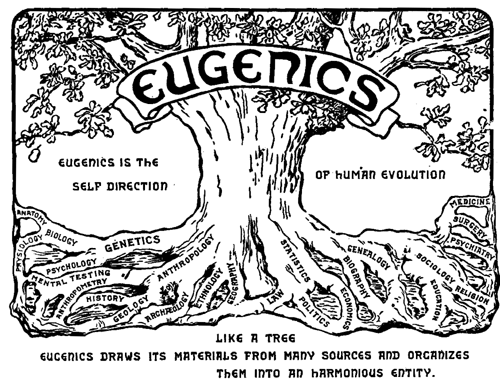
Logo from the Second International Eugenics Conference held in 1921

Three international eugenics conferences, gatherings that attracted scientists and medical practitioners, were held between 1912 and 1932. These conferences are often regarded as the high water mark of the Eugenics movement, which claimed a scientific basis for racial theories.

According to sociologist Shelley Reuter, early medical writing about Tay–Sachs disease often treated Tay–Sachs disease as an exclusively Jewish disease and in the process contributed to a characterization of Jews as a racial group. This treatment mirrored the view of genetic disease in society as a whole, in a time when the Eugenics movement was ascendant. When the disease was reported in non-Jewish patients, physicians were skeptical. Often, they questioned the diagnosis, or they speculated that the patient must have "Jewish blood." Sachs, who was Jewish, at first questioned how the disease could be confined to Jews. But by 1903 he was convinced: "Why children of one race should be affected so much more often than those of others, when the allied conditions show no such preference, remains as great a puzzle as ever."

Among physicians, the characterization of humanity according to race was taken for granted. The question of whether Jews constitute a "pure race" or a "mixed race" was under debate, and Tay–Sachs disease was seen as evidence of a Jewish racial type, which was believed to have a predilection for neurological disorders. Even the Jewish Encyclopedia reflected such a characterization of Tay–Sachs disease:

In the present state of knowledge of the etiology of idiocy and imbecility in general the only cause of their frequency among Jews that may be considered is the neurotic taint of the race. Children descending from a neurotic ancestry have nervous systems which are very unstable, and they are often incapable of tiding safely over the crises attending growth and development. They are often idiots or imbeciles.

In the United States, the World War I era was a period of rising nativism, of hostility to immigrants. Jewish immigration to the United States peaked in the period 1880–1924, with most of the immigrants arriving from Russia and countries in Eastern Europe. Opponents of immigration often questioned whether immigrants from southern and eastern Europe, such as Italians and Jews, could be assimilated into American society. Reports of Tay–Sachs disease contributed to a perception among nativists that Jews were an inferior race. Reuter writes, "The fact that Jewish immigrants continued to display their nervous tendencies in America where they were free from persecution was seen as proof of their biological inferiority and raised concerns about the degree to which they were being permitted free entry into the US."

== Scientific methodology ==
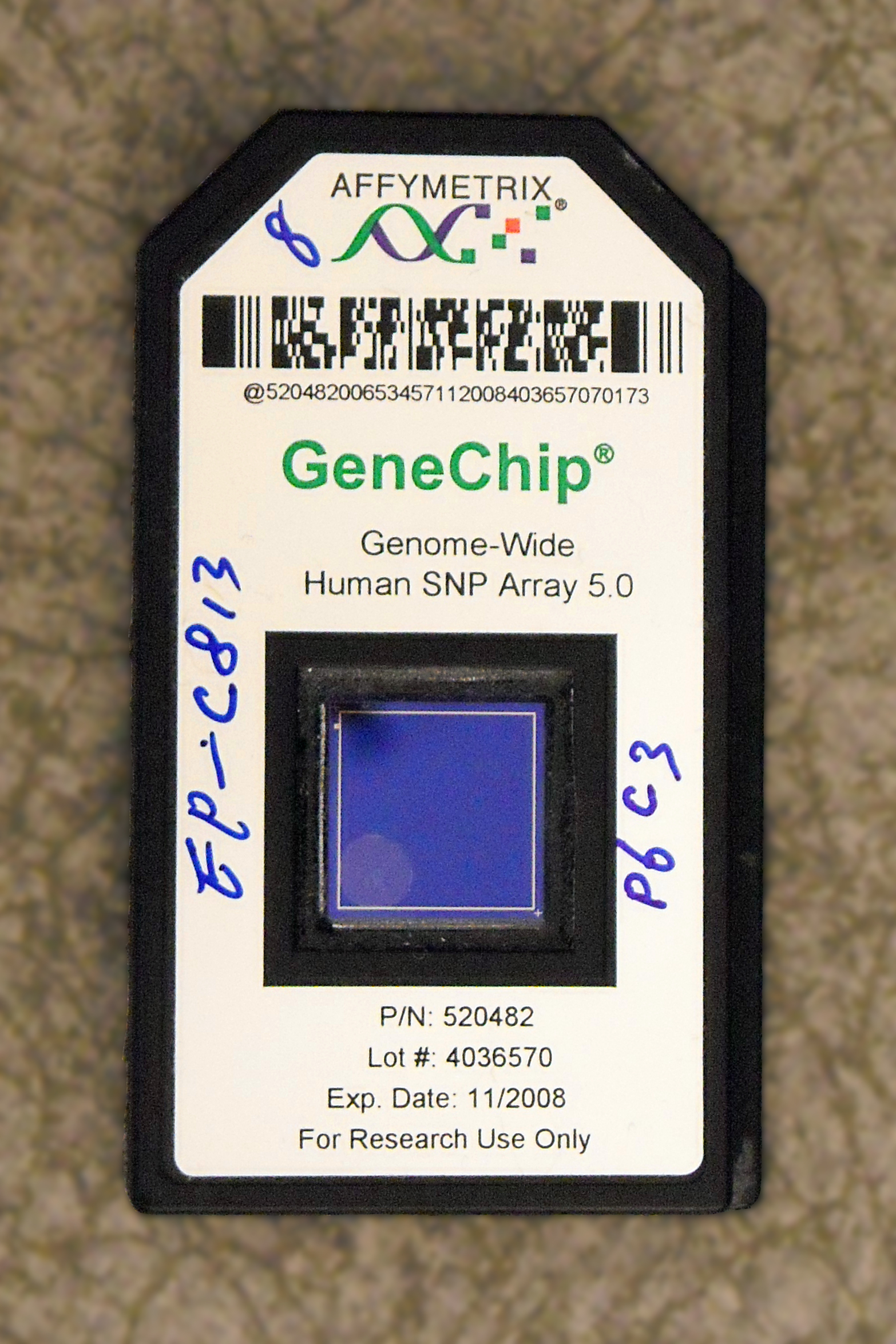
DNA microarray (2008) allows for assay of approximately 500,000 polymorphisms in a single genome.

Eugenic and racial theories fell out of favor among scientists with the rise of Fascism and Nazism in Europe. After World War II, eugenics became associated with Nazi abuses, such as enforced racial hygiene, human experimentation, and the extermination of undesired population groups. At the same time that interest in racial theories was waning, progress in biochemistry, molecular biology, and genetics was paving the way for a scientific reappraisal and understanding of Tay–Sachs disease.

With the rediscovery of Mendel's work after 1900, scientists began to identify human genetic diseases that could be explained by Mendelian patterns. By the 1930s, hundreds of cases of Tay–Sachs disease had been reported in medical literature. David Slome, a researcher in the Department of Social Biology at the University of London, summarizing the knowledge of the time, concluded that Tay–Sachs disease was caused by a single genetic defect, and that it followed an autosomal recessive pattern of inheritance. Slome also concluded that Tay–Sachs was not exclusively a Jewish phenomenon. "Although initially regarded as being limited to the Hebrew race, undoubtedly authentic cases of the disease have been reported in Gentile families. The author has found records of eighteen such cases in the literature examined."

Biochemistry as a distinct scientific field is often dated to the discovery of enzymes in 1897, to roughly the same time frame as the rediscovery of Mendel's work. However, it was not until the 1940s that the concept of metabolic pathway was understood and accepted. The one gene one enzyme model of George Beadle and Edward Tatum integrated biochemistry with molecular genetics. In the new model, it was also recognized that genes and their protein products perform regulatory functions in the cell, controlling enzyme activity in metabolic pathways. This new understanding of metabolic processes paved the way for advances in both biochemistry and genetics that would lead to testing for genetic disease. Biochemists of this era were able to identify and characterize mutations indirectly through protein sequencing, but lacked the molecular techniques to observe mutations directly.

By the early 1960s, this new partnership of biochemistry and Mendelian genetics had achieved a success, the detection of phenylketonuria, an autosomal recessive genetic disorder also. Phenylketonuria is a common metabolic disease in which the failure of an essential liver enzyme, needed to break down a byproduct of digestion of certain proteins, leads to mental retardation and other neurological problems. Success with phenylketonuria was brought about through mass post-natal screening of newborn infants, together with dietary modification, a form of substrate reduction therapy. Although there is no cure for phenylketonuria, early detection made it possible for patients to avoid its harmful effects and live essentially normal lives. By the late 1960s, post-natal screening for phenylketonuria was mandated in the United States and most industrial nations. Although carrier screening was not yet available, phenylketonuria was a spectacular success for public health, the first successful application of mass screening in medical genetics.

In 1969, John S. O'Brien demonstrated that Tay–Sachs disease was caused by a defect in a crucial enzyme. He also proved that Tay–Sachs disease patients could be diagnosed by enzyme assay of hexosaminidase A. Further development of enzyme assay testing demonstrated that levels of both hexosaminidases A and B could be measured in patients and carriers, allowing reliable detection of heterozygotes. During the early 1970s, researchers developed protocols for newborn testing, carrier screening, and pre-natal diagnosis. By the end of the 1970s, researchers had identified three variant forms of GM2 gangliosidosis, including Sandhoff disease and AB variant, accounting for false negatives in carrier testing.
