= GM 2 gangliosidosis =

GM 2 gangliosidosis refers to several similar genetic disorders:

- Tay–Sachs disease
- Sandhoff disease
- GM2-gangliosidosis, AB variant
