= GM2A =

Mammalian protein found in Homo sapiens

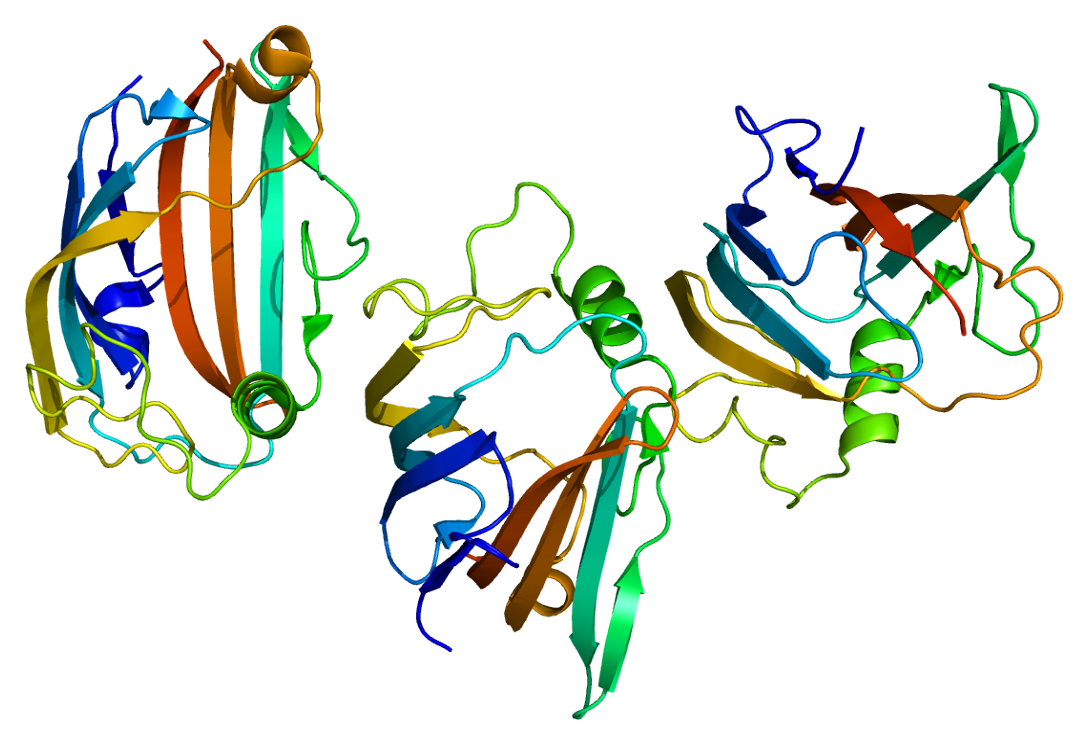

Identifiers
- Aliases: GM2A, GM2-AP, SAP-3, GM2 ganglioside activator, GM2AP, ganglioside GM2 activator
- External IDs: OMIM: 613109; MGI: 95762; GeneCards: GM2A
Available structures
PDB	Ortholog search: PDBe RCSB
PDB	List of PDB id codes 1G13, 1PU5, 1PUB, 1TJJ, 2AF9, 2AG2, 2AG4, 2AG9

Gene location (Human)
Chr.	Chromosome 5 (human)
Band	5q33.1	Start	151,212,150 bp
Band	5q33.1	End	151,270,440 bp

Gene location (Mouse)
Chr.	Chromosome 11 (mouse)
Band	11 B1.3|11 32.13 cM	Start	54,988,941 bp
Band	11 B1.3|11 32.13 cM	End	55,003,855 bp
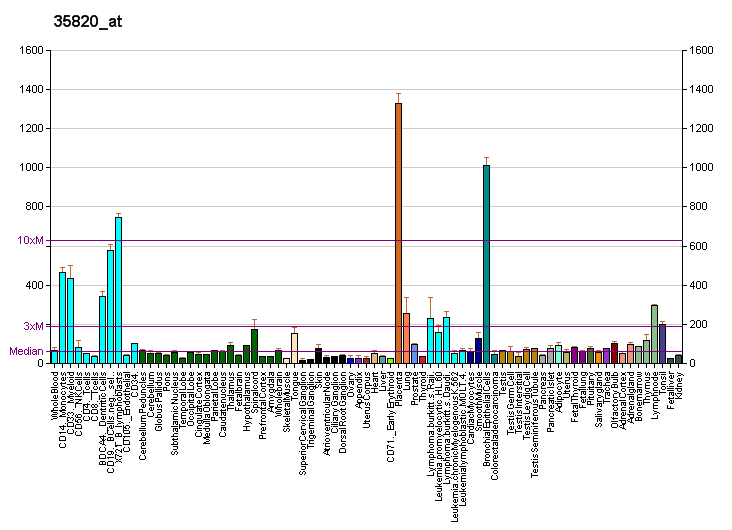

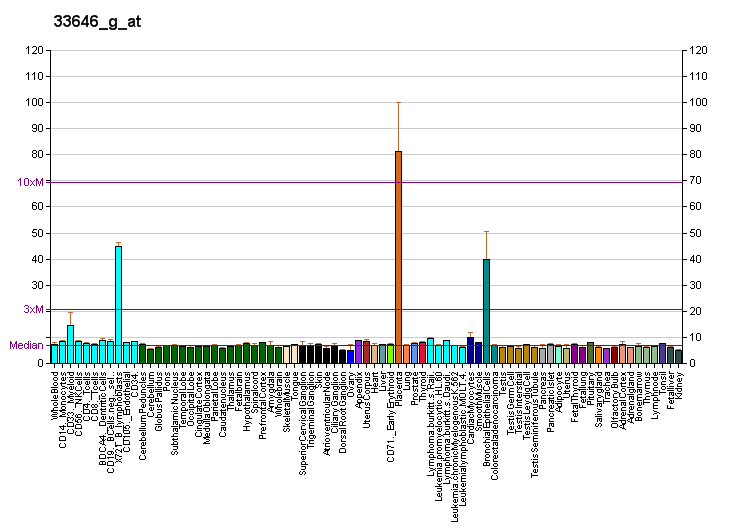

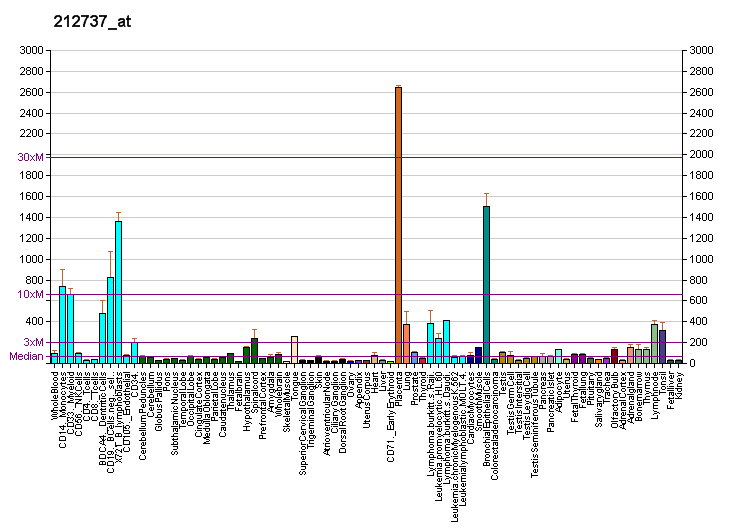
RNA expression pattern
Bgee	Human / Mouse (ortholog); Top expressed in: vulva; human penis; placenta; cervix epithelium; gums; gingival epithelium; skin of thigh; nipple; skin of hip; inferior ganglion of vagus nerve / Top expressed in: gastrula; superior surface of tongue; mesenteric lymph nodes; ascending aorta; aortic valve; choroid plexus of fourth ventricle; gallbladder; vestibular membrane of cochlear duct; cumulus cell; adrenal gland; More reference expression data
BioGPS	More reference expression data
Gene ontology
Molecular function	lipid transporter activity; phospholipase activator activity; beta-N-acetylgalactosaminidase activity; beta-N-acetylhexosaminidase activity; enzyme activator activity; hydrolase activity; sphingolipid activator protein activity
Cellular component	cytoplasm; apical cortex; lysosomal lumen; mitochondrion; potassium:proton exchanging ATPase complex; cytoplasmic side of plasma membrane; lysosome; extracellular exosome; extracellular region; azurophil granule lumen; basolateral plasma membrane; apical plasma membrane
Biological process	positive regulation of hydrolase activity; lipid transport; glycosphingolipid metabolic process; neuromuscular process controlling balance; lipid metabolism; lipid storage; nervous system process; learning or memory; oligosaccharide catabolic process; ganglioside metabolic process; ganglioside catabolic process; sphingolipid metabolic process; neutrophil degranulation; positive regulation of catalytic activity
Sources:Amigo / QuickGO
Orthologs
Databases	NCBI: entry; OMA: entry
Species	Human	Mouse
Entrez	2760	14667
Ensembl	ENSG00000196743	ENSMUSG00000000594
UniProt	P17900	Q60648
RefSeq (mRNA)	NM_001167607; NM_000405	NM_010299
RefSeq (protein)	NP_000396; NP_001161079	NP_034429
Location (UCSC)	Chr 5: 151.21 – 151.27 Mb	Chr 11: 54.99 – 55 Mb
PubMed search
- Wikidata
View/Edit Human	View/Edit Mouse

GM2 ganglioside activator also known as GM2A is a protein which in humans is encoded by the GM2A gene.

== Function ==
The protein encoded by this gene is a small glycolipid transport protein which acts as a substrate specific co-factor for the lysosomal enzyme β-hexosaminidase A. β-hexosaminidase A, together with GM2 ganglioside activator, catalyzes the degradation of the ganglioside GM2, and other molecules containing terminal N-acetyl hexosamines.

GM2A is a lipid transfer protein that stimulates the enzymatic processing of gangliosides, and also T-cell activation through lipid presentation. This protein binds molecules of ganglioside GM2, extracts them from membranes, and presents them to beta-hexosaminidase A for cleavage of N-acetyl-D-galactosamine and conversion to GM3.

It was identified as a member of ML domain family of proteins involved in innate immunity and lipid metabolism in the SMART database. .

== Regulation ==
In melanocytic cells GM2A gene expression may be regulated by MITF.

== Clinical significance ==
Mutations in this gene, inherited in an autosomal recessive pattern, result in GM2-gangliosidosis, AB variant, a rare GM2 gangliosidosis that has symptoms and pathology identical with Tay–Sachs disease and Sandhoff disease.

GM2A mutations are rarely reported, and the cases that are observed often occur with consanguineous parents or in genetically isolated populations.

Because AB variant is so rarely diagnosed, even in infants, it is likely that most mutations of GM2A are fatal in the fetus in homozygotes and genetic compounds, and thus are never observed clinically.

== See also ==
- Gangliosidosis
- Sandhoff disease
- Tay–Sachs disease
- Hexosaminidase
- GM1
