= CHB HEX N-terminal domain =

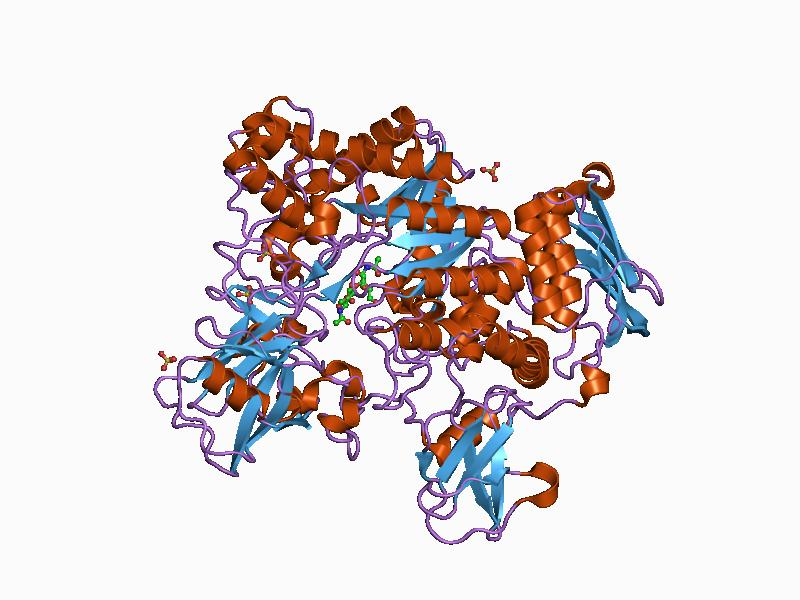
- beta-n-acetylhexosaminidase mutant e540d complexed with di-n acetyl-d-glucosamine (chitobiase)

Identifiers
- Symbol: CHB_HEX
- Pfam: PF03173
- Pfam clan: CL0203
- InterPro: IPR004866
- SCOP2: 1c7s / SCOPe / SUPFAM
Available protein structures:
- Pfam: structures / ECOD
- PDB: RCSB PDB; PDBe; PDBj
- PDBsum: structure summary

In molecular biology, the CHB HEX N-terminal domain represents the N-terminal domain in chitobiases and beta-hexosaminidases. Chitobiases degrade chitin, which forms the exoskeleton in insects and crustaceans, and which is one of the most abundant polysaccharides on earth. Beta-hexosaminidases are composed of either a HexA/HexB heterodimer or a HexB homodimer, and can hydrolyse diverse substrates, including GM(2)-gangliosides; mutations in this enzyme are associated with Tay–Sachs disease. HexB is structurally similar to chitobiase, consisting of a beta sandwich structure; this structure is similar to that found in the cellulose-binding domain of cellulase from Cellulomonas fimi. This domain may function as a carbohydrate binding module.
