= Sphingolipidoses =

- Other names: Sphingolipidosis
- Diagram showing some of the sphingolipidoses
- Specialty: Medical genetics

Sphingolipidoses are a class of lipid storage disorders or degenerative storage disorders caused by deficiency of an enzyme that is required for the catabolism of lipids that contain ceramide, also relating to sphingolipid metabolism. The main members of this group are Niemann–Pick disease, Fabry disease, Krabbe disease, Gaucher disease, Tay–Sachs disease and metachromatic leukodystrophy. They are generally inherited in an autosomal recessive fashion, but notably Fabry disease is X-linked recessive. Taken together, sphingolipidoses have an incidence of approximately 1 in 10,000, but substantially more in certain populations such as Ashkenazi Jews. Enzyme replacement therapy is available to treat mainly Fabry disease and Gaucher disease, and people with these types of sphingolipidoses may live well into adulthood. The other types are generally fatal by age 1 to 5 years for infantile forms, but progression may be mild for juvenile- or adult-onset forms.

== Accumulated products ==
- Gangliosides: Gangliosidosis
  - GM1 gangliosidoses
  - GM2 gangliosidoses
    - Tay–Sachs disease
    - Sandhoff disease
    - GM2-gangliosidosis, AB variant
- Glycolipids
  - Fabry's disease
  - Krabbe disease
  - Metachromatic leukodystrophy
- Glucocerebrosides
  - Gaucher's disease

== Comparison ==
Comparison of the main sphingolipidoses
Disease	Deficient enzyme	Accumulated products	Symptoms	Inheritance	Incidence	Generally accepted treatments	Prognosis
Niemann-Pick disease	Sphingomyelinase	Sphingomyelin in brain and RBCs	Mental retardation; Spasticity; Seizures; Hepatosplenomegaly; Thrombocytopenia; Ataxia	Autosomal recessive	1 in 100,000	Limited	Highly variable, infantile neurovisceral Niemann Pick disease (Type A ASMD) is usually fatal before 3 years of age. Estimasted mortality before adulthood for the Chronic visceral form (type B) is around 15-25%. Many live well into adulthood and may reach a normal lifespan. Diagnosis have been made in the 7th decade of life.
Fabry disease	α-galactosidase A	Glycolipids, particularly ceramide trihexoside, in brain, heart, kidney	Ischemic infarction in affected organs; Acroparesthesia; Angiokeratomas; hypohidrosis	X-linked	Between 1 in 40,000 to 1 in 120,000 live births for males	Enzyme replacement therapy (but expensive)	Life expectancy among males of approximately 60 years
Krabbe disease	Galactocerebrosidase	Glycolipids, particularly galactocerebroside, in oligodendrocytes	Spasticity; Neurodenegeration (leading to death); Hypertonia; Hyperreflexia; Decerebration-like posture; Blindness; Deafness	Autosomal recessive	About 1 in 100,000 births	Bone marrow transplant (high risk, potential failure, effectively provides enzyme replacement to the central nervous system from six months post-transplant, if done in the earliest stages; less effective enzyme replacement provision for the peripheral nervous system)	Untransplanted, and in the case of a failed transplant, generally fatal before age 2 for infants
Gaucher disease	Glucocerebrosidase	Glucocerebrosides in RBCs, liver and spleen	Hepatosplenomegaly; Pancytopenia; Bone pain; Erlenmeyer flask deformity	Autosomal recessive	About 1 in 20,000 live births, more among Ashkenazi Jews	Enzyme replacement therapy (but expensive)	May live well into adulthood
Tay–Sachs disease	Hexosaminidase A	GM2 gangliosides in neurons	Neurodegeneration; Developmental disability; Early death	Autosomal recessive	Approximately 1 in 320,000 newborns in the general population, more in Ashkenazi Jews	None	Death by approx. 4 years for infantile Tay–Sachs
Metachromatic leukodystrophy (MLD)	Arylsulfatase A or prosaposin	Sulfatide compounds in neural tissue	Demyelination in CNS and PNS: Intellectual disability; Motor dysfunction; Ataxia; Hyporeflexia; Seizures	Autosomal recessive	1 in 40,000 to 1 in 160,000	Bone marrow transplant (high risk, potential failure, effectively provides enzyme replacement to the central nervous system from six months post-transplant, if done in the earliest stages; less effective enzyme replacement provision for the peripheral nervous system)	Untransplanted, and in the case of a failed transplant, death by approx. 5 years for infantile MLD

== See also ==
- Lipid storage disorder
