= Pseudodeficiency alleles =

A pseudodeficiency allele or pseudodeficiency mutation is a mutation that alters the protein product or changes the gene's expression, but without causing disease. For example, in the lysosomal storage diseases, patients with a pseudodeficiency allele show greatly reduced enzyme activity, yet they remain clinically healthy.

In medical genetics, a false positive result occurs in an enzyme assay test when test results are positive, but disease or morbidity is not present. One possible cause of false positive results is a pseudodeficiency allele. Disease may also be present, but at a subclinical level.

== Examples ==
- Tay–Sachs disease. Enzyme assay testing was especially effective among Ashkenazi Jews because fewer pseudodeficiency alleles are found in this population, as compared with the general population. Carrier screening has not been as reliable in the general population.
- Metachromatic leukodystrophy. Low arylsulphatase A activity can occur in healthy individuals. This poses a challenge in genetic testing, making it difficult to distinguish between patients who are at risk of developing the disease and those who are healthy carriers of a pseudodeficiency mutation. Metachromatic leukodystrophy is a classic example of the difficulties caused by pseudodeficiency in carrier screening, because very high pseudodeficiency carrier frequencies have been detected in some populations.

== Implications ==
A pseudodeficiency allele may indicate a deficiency of the enzyme assay method, or it may reflect incomplete understanding of the enzyme's activity.

- The enzyme assay may be invalid because of differences between the natural substrate and an artificial substrate used in testing.
- The gene may be expressed differently in different tissues, causing a positive result in the tissue that is tested even though no disease is present. Blood serum is often used for enzyme assay testing because it can be sampled inexpensively. Testing with other tissue types may produce more reliable results.
- The enzyme assay may be valid, but understanding of the disease and the metabolic pathway in which it occurs may be incorrect or incomplete.

Because of pseudodeficiency alleles, the results of enzyme assay testing in one population cannot be generalized to other populations. For example, while Tay–Sachs screening was able to nearly eliminate Tay–Sachs disease among Ashkenazi Jews, similar screening in the general population has proven less effective.

For some genetic diseases, especially those that have low penetrance or are easily treatable, carrier screening may be of questionable value when pseudodeficiency alleles are present at high frequency.
