= Sulfatidosis =

- Specialty: Endocrinology

Sulfatidosis is a form of lysosomal storage disease resulting in a proliferation of sulfatide.

== Causes ==
It is caused by a genetic insufficiency of sulfatase enzymes.

== Diagnosis ==
=== Types ===
Metachromatic leukodystrophy and multiple sulfatase deficiency are classified as sulfatidoses.

== See also ==
- Sphingolipidoses#Overview for an overview table, including sulfatidosis
