= Compound heterozygosity =

Condition in medical genetics

In medical genetics, compound heterozygosity is the condition of having two or more heterogeneous recessive alleles at a particular locus that can cause genetic disease in a heterozygous state; that is, an organism is a compound heterozygote when it has two recessive alleles for the same gene, but with those two alleles being different from each other (for example, both alleles might be mutated but at different locations). Compound heterozygosity reflects the diversity of the mutation base for many autosomal recessive genetic disorders; mutations in most disease-causing genes have arisen many times. This means that many cases of disease arise in individuals who have two unrelated alleles, who technically are heterozygotes, but both the alleles are defective.

These disorders are often best known in some classic form, such as the homozygous recessive case of a particular mutation that is widespread in some population. In its compound heterozygous forms, the disease may have lower penetrance, because the mutations involved are often less deleterious in combination than for a homozygous individual with the classic symptoms of the disease. As a result, compound heterozygotes often become ill later in life, with less severe symptoms. Although compound heterozygosity as a cause of genetic disease had been suspected much earlier, widespread confirmation of the phenomenon was not feasible until the 1980s, when polymerase chain reaction techniques for amplification of DNA made it cost-effective to sequence genes and identify polymorphic alleles.

== Cause ==
Compound heterozygosity is one of the causes of variation in genetic disease. The diagnosis and nomenclature for such disorders sometimes reflects history, because most diseases were first observed and classified based on biochemistry and pathophysiology before genetic diagnosis was available. Some genetic disorders are really a family of related disorders that occur in the same metabolic pathway, or in related pathways. Naming conventions for the disease became established before precise molecular diagnosis was possible.

For example, hemochromatosis is the name given to several different heritable diseases with the same outcome, excess absorption of iron. These variants all reflect a failure in a metabolic pathway associated with iron metabolism, however mutations that cause hemochromatosis can occur at different gene loci. Mutations have occurred at each locus many times, and a few such mutations have become widespread in some population. The fact that multiple loci are involved is the primary cause for the variant forms of hemochromatosis and its outcome. This variation is caused not by compound heterozygosity, but rather by the fact that several different enzyme defects can cause the disease. Clinically, most cases of hemochromatosis are found in homozygotes for the most common mutation in the HFE gene. But at each gene locus associated with the disease, there is the possibility of compound heterozygosity, often caused by inheritance of two unrelated alleles, of which one is a common or classic mutation, while the other is a rare or even novel one.

For some genetic diseases, environmental cofactors are an important determinant of variation and outcome. In the case of hemochromatosis, penetrance is incomplete, even for the classic HFE mutation, and is affected by gender, diet, and behaviors such as alcohol consumption. Compound heterozygotes are often observed only through subclinical symptoms such as excess iron. Disease is rarely observed in such compound heterozygotes unless other causal factors (such as alcoholism) are present. As a result, compound heterozygosity for hemochromatosis may be more common than diagnosis based on pathology would suggest.

Some genetic diseases are named more precisely, and represent a single point of failure on a metabolic pathway. For example, Tay–Sachs disease, GM2-gangliosidosis, AB variant, and Sandhoff disease might easily have been defined together as a single disease, because the three disorders are associated with failure of the same enzyme and have the same outcome. However, the three were discovered and named separately, and each represents a distinct molecular point of failure in a subunit that is required for activation of the enzyme. For all three disorders, compound heterozygosity is responsible for variant forms. For example, both TSD and Sandhoff disease have a more common infantile form and several late-onset variants. Post-infantile forms, which are rare, are generally caused by the inheritance of two unrelated alleles, of which one is usually a classic mutation, while the other is a rare or even novel one.

== Examples ==
- Phenylketonuria. Because phenylketonuria was the first genetic disorder for which mass post-natal genetic screening was available, beginning in the early 1960s, atypical cases were detected almost immediately. Molecular analysis of the genome was not yet possible, but protein sequencing revealed cases caused by compound heterozygosity. As molecular genomic techniques became available in the 1980s and 1990s, it became possible to explain a range of disorders in heterozygotes carrying one copy of one of the classic mutations for phenylketonuria.
- Tay–Sachs disease. In addition to its classic infantile form, Tay Sachs disease may present in juvenile or adult onset forms, often as the result of compound heterozygosity between two alleles, one that causes the classic infantile disease in homozygotes and another that allows some residual HEXA enzyme activity.
- Sickle cell syndromes. A variety of sickle cell disorders result from inheritance of the sickle cell gene in a compound heterozygous manner with other mutant beta globin genes. These disorders include sickle cell-beta thalassemia. In the case of sickle cell anemia, an individual with one allele for hemoglobin S and one allele for hemoglobin C would still develop the disease, despite being heterozygous for both genes.
