= Hyperchloremic acidosis =

- Specialty: Endocrinology, nephrology

Hyperchloremic acidosis is a form of metabolic acidosis associated with a normal anion gap, a decrease in plasma bicarbonate concentration, and an increase in plasma chloride concentration (see anion gap for a fuller explanation). Although plasma anion gap is normal, this condition is often associated with an increased urine anion gap, due to the kidney's inability to secrete ammonia.

== Causes ==
In general, the cause of a hyperchloremic metabolic acidosis is a loss of base, either a gastrointestinal loss or a renal loss.

- Gastrointestinal loss of bicarbonate (HCO^{−}_{3})
  - Severe diarrhea (vomiting will tend to cause hypochloraemic alkalosis)
  - Pancreatic fistula with loss of bicarbonate rich pancreatic fluid
  - Nasojejunal tube losses in the context of small bowel obstruction and loss of alkaline proximal small bowel secretions
  - Chronic laxative abuse
- Renal causes
  - Proximal renal tubular acidosis with failure of HCO^{−}_{3} resorption
  - Distal renal tubular acidosis with failure of H^{+} secretion
  - Long-term use of a carbonic anhydrase inhibitor such as acetazolamide
- Other causes
  - Ingestion of ammonium chloride, hydrochloric acid, or other acidifying salts
  - The treatment and recovery phases of diabetic ketoacidosis
  - Volume resuscitation with 0.9% normal saline provides a chloride load, so that infusing more than 3–4L can cause acidosis
  - Hyperalimentation (i.e., total parenteral nutrition)

== See also ==
- Anion gap
- Metabolic acidosis
- Pseudohypoaldosteronism
