= Lipid storage disorder =

Group of genetic diseases involving the harmful accumulation of lipids in cells

- Specialty: Endocrinology

A lipid storage disorder (or lipidosis) is any one of a group of inherited metabolic disorders in which harmful amounts of fats or lipids accumulate in some body cells and tissues. People with these disorders either do not produce enough of one of the enzymes needed to metabolize and break down lipids or, they produce enzymes that do not work properly. Over time, the buildup of fats may cause permanent cellular and tissue damage, particularly in the brain, peripheral nervous system, liver, spleen, and bone marrow.

Inside cells under normal conditions, lysosomes convert, or metabolize, lipids and proteins into smaller components to provide energy for the body.

== Classification ==
Disorders that store this intracellular material are part of the lysosomal storage diseases family of disorders.

=== Sphingolipidoses ===
Many lipid storage disorders can be classified into the subgroup of sphingolipidoses, as they relate to sphingolipid metabolism. Members of this group include Niemann-Pick disease, Fabry disease, Krabbe disease, Gaucher disease, Tay–Sachs disease, metachromatic leukodystrophy, multiple sulfatase deficiency, and Farber disease. They are generally inherited in an autosomal recessive fashion, but Fabry disease is X-linked. Taken together, sphingolipidoses have an incidence of approximately 1 in 10,000. Enzyme replacement therapy is available mainly to treat Fabry disease and Gaucher disease and people with these types of sphingolipidoses may live well into adulthood. Generally, the other types are fatal by age 1 to 5 years for infantile forms, but progression may be mild for juvenile-onset or adult-onset forms.

Alternatively, some of the sphingolipidoses may be classified into either GM1 gangliosidoses or GM2 gangliosidoses. Tay–Sachs disease belongs to the latter.

=== Other ===
Other lipid storage disorders that generally are not classified as sphingolipidoses include fucosidosis, Schindler disease, and Wolman disease.

== Genetics ==
Lipid storage diseases can be inherited two ways: Autosomal recessive inheritance occurs when both parents carry and pass on a copy of the faulty gene, but neither parent show signs and symptoms of the condition and is not affected by the disorder. Each child born to these parents have a 25 percent chance of inheriting both copies of the defective gene, a 50 percent chance of being a carrier, and a 25 percent chance of not inheriting either copy of the defective gene. Children of either gender may be affected by an autosomal recessive this pattern of inheritance.

X-linked recessive (or sex linked) inheritance occurs when the mother carries the affected gene on the X chromosome that has determined the child's gender and passes it to her son. Sons of carriers have a 50 percent chance of inheriting the disorder. Daughters have a 50 percent chance of inheriting the X-linked chromosome, but usually are not severely affected by the disorder. Affected men do not pass the disorder to their sons, but their daughters will be carriers for the disorder.

== Diagnosis ==
Diagnosis of the lipid storage disorders can be achieved through the use of several tests. These tests include clinical examination, biopsy, genetic testing, molecular analysis of cells or tissues, and enzyme assays. Certain forms of this disease also can be diagnosed through urine testing, which detects the stored material. Prenatal testing also is available to determine whether the fetus will have the disease or is a carrier.

== Treatment ==
There are no specific treatments for lipid storage disorders; however, there are some highly effective enzyme replacement therapies for people with type 1 Gaucher disease and some patients with type 3 Gaucher disease. There are other treatments such as the prescription of certain drugs such as phenytoin and carbamazepine to treat pain for patients with Fabry disease. Furthermore, gene therapies and bone marrow transplantation may prove to be effective for certain lipid storage disorders.

Diet restrictions do not help prevent the buildup of lipids in the tissues because the cells in the tissues synthesize lipids from any precursor readily available (such as amino acids or carbohydrates).

== See also ==
- Xanthomatosis
- Niemann–Pick disease
- Metabolic Myopathies
