= Gangliosidosis =

- Specialty: Endocrinology

Gangliosidosis contains different types of lipid storage disorders caused by the accumulation of lipids known as gangliosides. There are two distinct genetic causes of the disease. Both are autosomal recessive and affect males and females equally.

== Types ==
- GM1 gangliosidoses - GM1
- GM2 gangliosidoses - GM2

== See also ==
- Sphingolipidoses#Overview
