= Waren Tay =

British ophthalmologist (1843–1927)

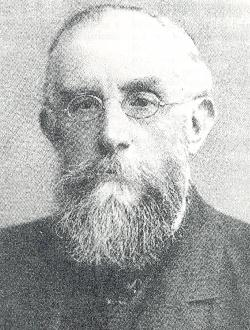
Tay in 1925

Waren Tay (1843 – 15 May 1927) was a British ophthalmologist who was a native of Yorkshire.

== Career ==
In 1881, Waren (often misspelt Warren) Tay first described the red spot on the retina of the eye that is present in Tay–Sachs disease. He reported this condition in the Volume I edition of the Ophthalmological Society, an organization in which he was a founding member. Here he described the symptoms in a child who also had neurological problems. Later in the Volume IV edition, he gave a complete description of the clinical symptoms of the disorder, and also reported that another member from the same family had this retinal condition.

In 1874, at the London Ophthalmic Hospital, Tay was the first to describe a condition that consisted of small white or yellow dots in the choroid around the macula in the eye, which are the manifestations of senile macular degeneration. Nowadays, this condition is sometimes referred to as "Hutchinson's disease", named after Tay's mentor, surgeon Jonathan Hutchinson.

Tay himself had glaucoma and was blind in one eye. He was a keen cyclist, and he was described by his friends as "a walking encyclopaedia of medicine".
