= GM2-gangliosidosis, AB variant =

- Other names: Hexosaminidase activator deficiency
- GM2-gangliosidosis, AB variant has an autosomal recessive pattern of inheritance.
- Specialty: Neurology, medical genetics, endocrinology

GM2-gangliosidosis, AB variant is a rare, autosomal recessive metabolic disorder that causes progressive destruction of nerve cells in the brain and spinal cord. It has a similar pathology to Sandhoff disease and Tay–Sachs disease. The three diseases are classified together as the GM2 gangliosidoses, because each disease represents a distinct molecular point of failure in the activation of the same enzyme, beta-hexosaminidase. AB variant is caused by a failure in the gene that makes an enzyme cofactor for beta-hexosaminidase, called the GM2 activator.

== Symptoms and signs ==
Signs and symptoms of GM2-gangliosidosis, AB variant are identical with those of infantile Tay–Sachs disease, except that enzyme assay testing shows normal levels of hexosaminidase A. Infantile Sandhoff disease has similar symptoms and prognosis, except that there is deficiency of both hexosaminidase A and hexosaminidase B. Infants with this disorder typically appear normal until the age of 3 to 6 months, when development slows and muscles used for movement weaken. Affected infants lose motor skills such as turning over, sitting, and crawling. As the disease progresses, infants develop seizures, vision and hearing loss, mental retardation, and paralysis.

An ophthalmological abnormality called a cherry-red spot, which can be identified with an eye examination, is characteristic of this disorder. This cherry-red spot is the same finding that Warren Tay first reported in 1881, when he identified a case of Tay–Sachs disease, and it has the same etiology.

The prognosis for AB variant is the same as for infantile Tay–Sachs disease. Children with AB variant die in infancy or early childhood.

== Cause ==
Mutations in the GM2A gene cause GM2-gangliosidosis, AB variant. This condition is inherited in an autosomal recessive pattern.

The GM2A gene provides instructions for making a protein called the GM2 activator. This protein is required for the normal function of beta-hexosaminidase A, a critical enzyme in the nervous system that breaks down a lipid called GM2 ganglioside. If mutations in both alleles at this locus disrupt the activity of the GM2 activator, beta-hexosaminidase A cannot perform its normal function. As a result, gangliosides accumulate in the central nervous system until they interfere with normal biological processes. Progressive damage caused by buildup of gangliosides leads to the destruction of nerve cells.

GM2-gangliosidosis, AB variant is extremely rare. In contrast with both Tay–Sachs disease and Sandhoff disease, in which many mutant polymorphic alleles have been discovered, including pseudodeficiency alleles, very few GM2A mutations have been reported. When AB variant is reported, in often occurs with consanguineous parents or in genetically isolated populations.

GM2A is expressed in many tissues, and the GM2 activator protein has been reported to have other cellular functions. Because AB variant is so rarely diagnosed, it is likely that most mutations of GM2A are fatal at the embryonic or fetal stage of development in homozygotes and genetic compounds, and thus are never observed clinically.

== History ==
AB variant was first observed clinically shortly after the biochemical characterization of Tay–Sachs disease in 1969. The disease was initially thought to be caused by variant alleles of the HEXA gene, and Konrad Sandhoff designated it as AB variant in 1971. Enzyme assay tests of TSD patients revealed a few unusual false negative cases, patients who developed the disease, yet had normal enzyme activity. In other cases, parents who had not tested as carriers for TSD had children who nevertheless became ill with the symptoms of classic infantile TSD.

It was eventually determined that GM2 gangliosidosis could be caused by mutations on three distinct genes, one of which was an activator protein. Disease caused by a mutation that disables this protein was termed AB variant. In 1992, the GM2A gene itself was localized to chromosome 5, and the precise locus was determined the following year.

== See also ==
- GM2 gangliosidoses
