= Hexosaminidase =

Class of enzymes

β-N-Acetylhexosaminidase
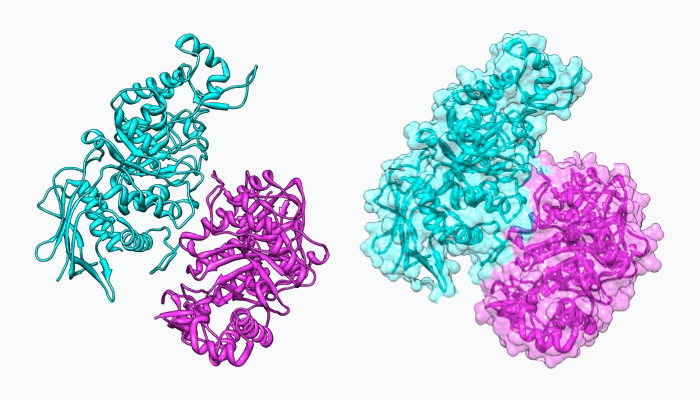
- Hexosaminidase A (Hex A)

Identifiers
- EC no.: 3.2.1.52
- CAS no.: 9012-33-3

Databases
- BRENDA: enzyme data
- ExPASy: NiceZyme view
- KEGG: enzyme entry
- MetaCyc: metabolic pathway
- Rhea: reactions
- PDB structures: RCSB PDB PDBe PDBsum
- Gene Ontology: AmiGO / QuickGO
Search
- PMC: articles
- PubMed: articles
- NCBI: proteins

Hexosaminidase (EC 3.2.1.52, β-acetylaminodeoxyhexosidase, N-acetyl-β-D-hexosaminidase, N-acetyl-β-hexosaminidase, N-acetyl hexosaminidase, β-hexosaminidase, β-acetylhexosaminidinase, β-D-N-acetylhexosaminidase, β-N-acetyl-D-hexosaminidase, β-N-acetylglucosaminidase, hexosaminidase A, N-acetylhexosaminidase, β-D-hexosaminidase) is an enzyme involved in the hydrolysis of terminal N-acetyl-D-hexosamine residues in N-acetyl-β-D-hexosaminides.

Elevated levels of hexosaminidase in blood and/or urine have been proposed as a biomarker of relapse in the treatment of alcoholism.

Hereditary inability to form functional hexosaminidase enzymes are the cause of lipid storage disorders Tay-Sachs disease and Sandhoff disease.

== Isoenzymes and genes ==
=== Lysosomal A, B, and S isoenzymes ===
Functional lysosomal β-hexosaminidase enzymes are dimeric in structure. Three isoenzymes are produced through the combination of α and β subunits to form any one of three active dimers:

hexosaminidase isoenzyme	subunit composition	function
A	α/β heterodimer	only isoenzyme that can hydrolyze G_{M2} ganglioside in vivo
B	β/β homodimer	exists in tissues but no known physiological function
S	α/α homodimer	exists in tissues but no known physiological function

The α and β subunits are encoded by separate genes, HEXA and HEXB respectively. β-Hexosaminidase and the cofactor G_{M2} activator protein catalyze the degradation of the G_{M2} gangliosides and other molecules containing terminal N-acetyl hexosamines. Gene mutations in HEXB often result in Sandhoff disease; whereas, mutations in HEXA decrease the hydrolysis of G_{M2} gangliosides, which is the main cause of Tay–Sachs disease.

β-hexosaminidase subunit α

Identifiers
- Symbol: HEXA
- NCBI gene: 3073
- HGNC: 4878
- OMIM: 606869
- RefSeq: NM_000520
- UniProt: P06865

Other data
- EC number: 3.2.1.52
- Locus: Chr. 15 q24.1
Search for
- Structures: Swiss-model
- Domains: InterPro

β-hexosaminidase subunit β

Identifiers
- Symbol: HEXB
- NCBI gene: 3074
- HGNC: 4879
- OMIM: 606873
- RefSeq: NM_000521
- UniProt: P07686

Other data
- EC number: 3.2.1.52
- Locus: Chr. 5 q13.3
Search for
- Structures: Swiss-model
- Domains: InterPro

==== Function ====
Even though the α and β subunits of lysosomal hexosaminidase can both cleave GalNAc residues, only the α subunit is able to hydrolyze G_{M2} gangliosides because of a key residue, Arg-424, and a loop structure that forms from the amino acid sequence in the alpha subunit. The loop in the α subunit, consisting of Gly-280, Ser-281, Glu-282, and Pro-283 which is absent in the β subunit, serves as an ideal structure for the binding of the G_{M2} activator protein (G_{M2}AP), and arginine is essential for binding the N-acetyl-neuraminic acid residue of G_{M2} gangliosides. The G_{M2} activator protein transports G_{M2} gangliosides and presents the lipids to hexosaminidase, so a functional hexosaminidase enzyme is able to hydrolyze G_{M2} gangliosides into G_{M3} gangliosides by removing the N-acetylgalactosamine (GalNAc) residue from G_{M2} gangliosides.

==== Mechanism of action ====
A Michaelis complex consisting of a glutamate residue, a GalNAc residue on the G_{M2} ganglioside, and an aspartate residue leads to the formation of an oxazolinium ion intermediate. A glutamate residue (α Glu-323/β Glu-355) works as an acid by donating its hydrogen to the glycosidic oxygen atom on the GalNAc residue. An aspartate residue (α Asp-322/β Asp-354) positions the C2-acetamindo group so that it can be attacked by the nucleophile (N-acetamido oxygen atom on carbon 1 of the substrate). The aspartate residue stabilizes the positive charge on the nitrogen atom in the oxazolinium ion intermediate. Following the formation of the oxazolinium ion intermediate, water attacks the electrophillic acetal carbon. Glutamate acts as a base by deprotonating the water leading to the formation of the product complex and the G_{M3}ganglioside.

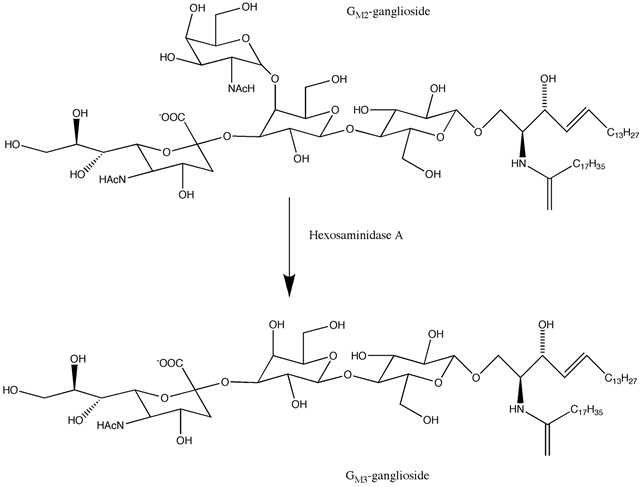
Hydrolysis of G_{M2} ganglioside to G_{M3} ganglioside catalyzed by hexosaminidase A.

The mechanism of the hydrolysis of a G_{M2} ganglioside and removal of a GalNAc residue to produce G_{M3} ganglioside.

==== Gene mutations resulting in Tay–Sachs disease ====
There are numerous mutations that lead to hexosaminidase deficiency including gene deletions, nonsense mutations, and missense mutations. Tay–Sachs disease occurs when hexosaminidase A loses its ability to function. People with Tay–Sachs disease are unable to remove the GalNAc residue from the G_{M2} ganglioside, and as a result, they end up storing 100 to 1000 times more G_{M2} gangliosides in the brain than the unaffected person. Over 100 different mutations have been discovered just in infantile cases of Tay–Sachs disease alone.

The most common mutation, which occurs in over 80 percent of Tay–Sachs patients, results from a four base pair addition (TATC) in exon 11 of the Hex A gene. This insertion leads to an early stop codon, which causes the Hex A deficiency.

Children born with Tay–Sachs usually die between two and four years of age from aspiration and pneumonia. Tay–Sachs causes cerebral degeneration and blindness. Patients also experience flaccid extremities and seizures. At present there has been no cure or effective treatment of Tay–Sachs disease.

NAG-thiazoline, NGT, acts as mechanism based inhibitor of hexosaminidase A. In patients with Tay–Sachs disease (misfolded hexosaminidase A), NGT acts as a molecular chaperone by binding in the active site of hexosaminidase A which helps create a properly folded hexosaminidase A. The stable dimer conformation of hexosaminidase A has the ability to leave the endoplasmic reticulum and is directed to the lysosome where it can perform the degradation of G_{M2} gangliosides. The two subunits of hexosaminidase A are shown below:

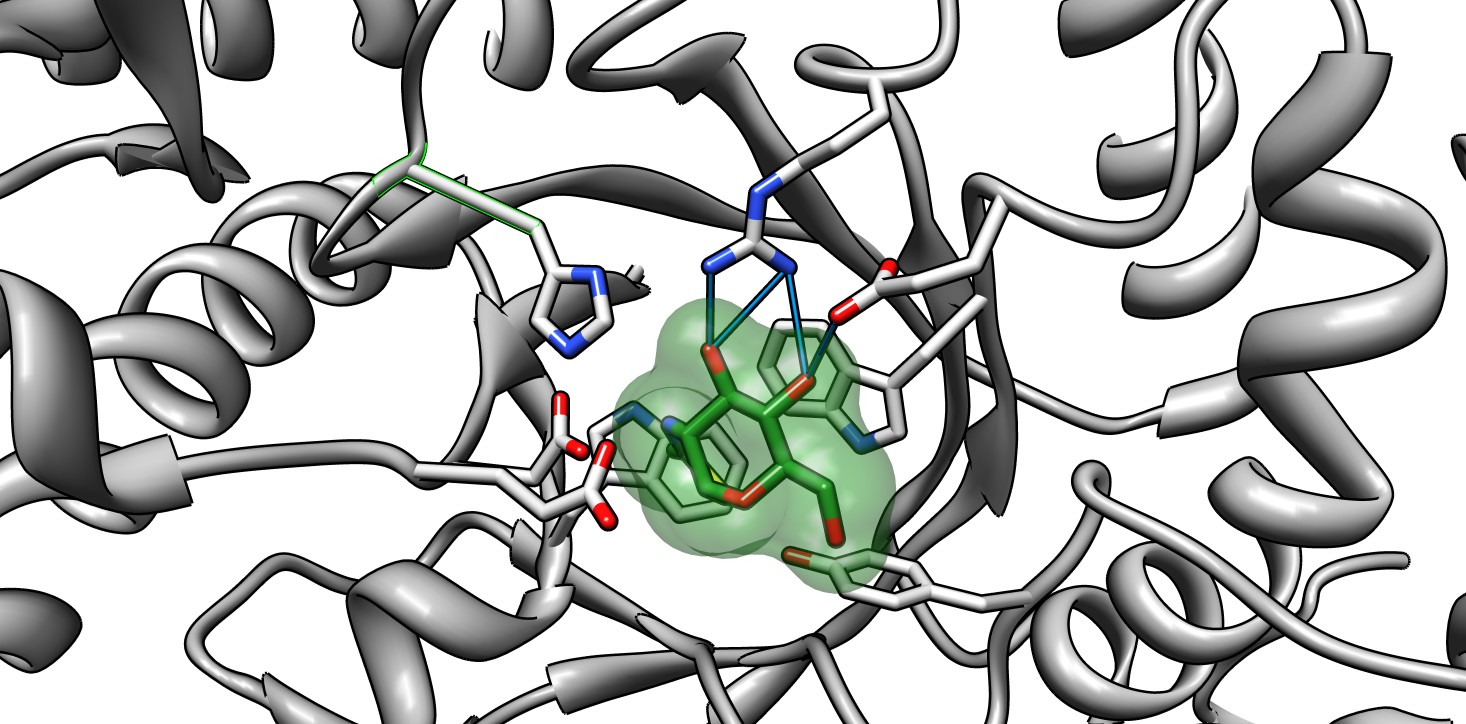
The α subunit active site shown bound to NAG-thiazoline (NGT) in β-hexosaminidase. PDB: 2GK1 The light green outline surrounding NGT represents the Van der Waals surface of NGT. The critical amino acids in the active site that are able to hydrogen bond with NGT include Arginine 178 and Glutamate 462.

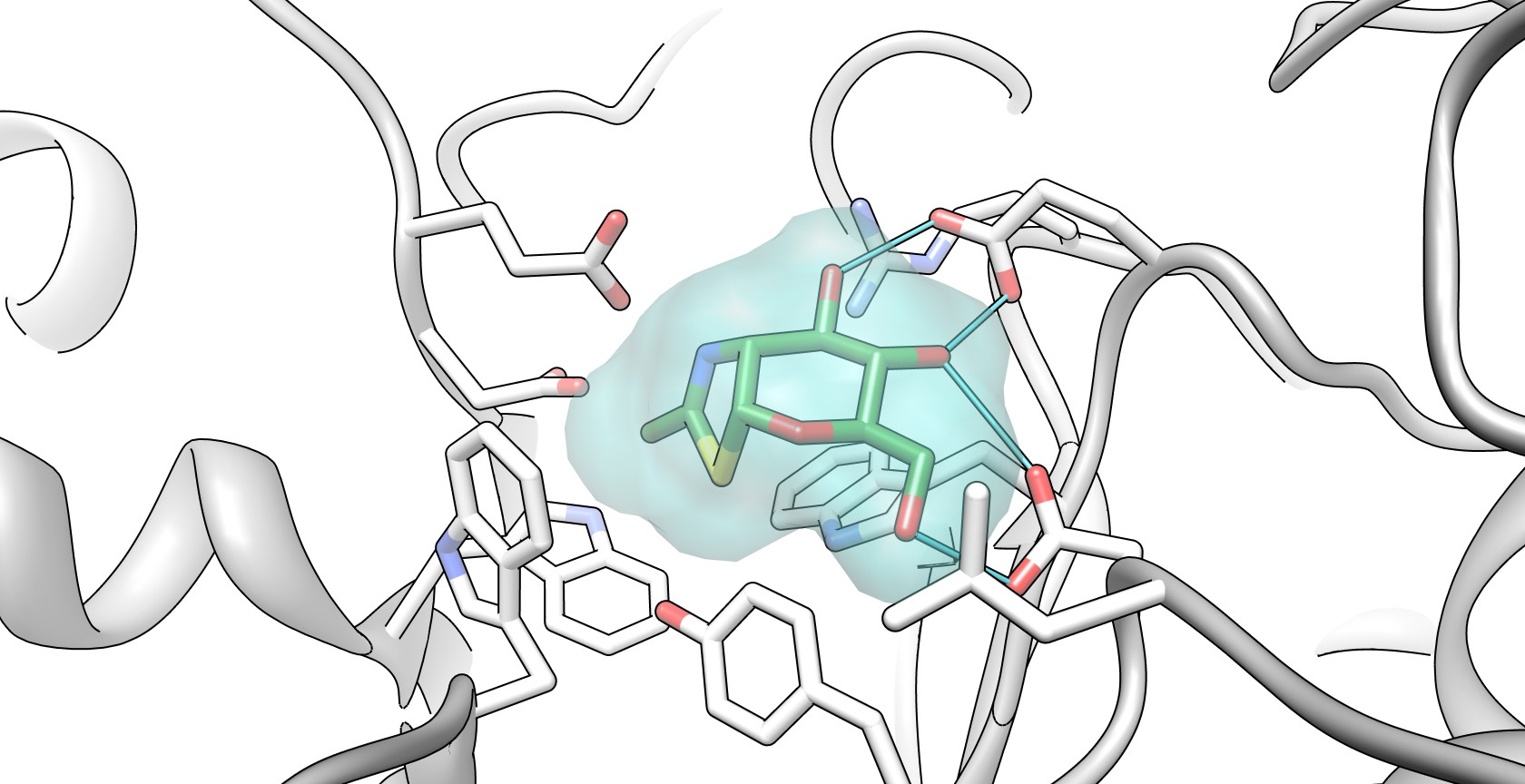
The β subunit active site shown bound to NAG-thiazoline (NGT) in β-hexosaminidase. PDB: 2GK1 The light blue outline surrounding NGT represents the Van der Waals surface of NGT. The critical amino acids in the active site that are able to hydrogen bond with NGT include Glutamate 491 and Aspartate 452.

=== Cytosolic C and D isozymes ===
The bifunctional protein NCOAT (nuclear cytoplasmic O-GlcNAcase and acetyltransferase) that is encoded by the MGEA5 gene possesses both hexosaminidase and histone acetyltransferase activities. NCOAT is also known as hexosaminidase C and has distinct substrate specificities compared to lysosomal hexosaminidase A. A single-nucleotide polymorphism in the human O-GlcNAcase gene is linked to diabetes mellitus type 2.

A fourth mammalian hexosaminidase polypeptide which has been designated hexosaminidase D (HEXDC) has recently been identified.

hexosaminidase C

Identifiers
- Symbol: MGEA5
- NCBI gene: 10724
- HGNC: 7056
- OMIM: 604039
- RefSeq: NM_012215
- UniProt: O60502

Other data
- EC number: 3.2.1.52
- Locus: Chr. 10 q24.1-24.3
Search for
- Structures: Swiss-model
- Domains: InterPro

hexosaminidase D

Identifiers
- Symbol: HEXDC
- Alt. symbols: FLJ23825
- NCBI gene: 284004
- HGNC: 26307
- RefSeq: NM_173620
- UniProt: Q8IYN4

Other data
- EC number: 3.2.1.52
- Locus: Chr. 17 q25.3
Search for
- Structures: Swiss-model
- Domains: InterPro
