= GM2 gangliosidoses =

- Specialty: Endocrinology

The GM2 gangliosidoses are a group of three related genetic disorders that result from a deficiency of the enzyme beta-hexosaminidase. This enzyme catalyzes the biodegradation of fatty acid derivatives known as gangliosides. The diseases are better known by their individual names: Tay–Sachs disease, AB variant, and Sandhoff disease.

Beta-hexosaminidase is a vital hydrolytic enzyme, found in the lysosomes, that breaks down lipids. When beta-hexosaminidase is no longer functioning properly, the lipids accumulate in the nervous tissue of the brain and cause problems. Gangliosides are made and biodegraded rapidly in early life as the brain develops. Except in some rare, late-onset forms, the GM2 gangliosidoses are fatal.

All three disorders are rare in the general population. Tay–Sachs disease has become famous as a public health model because an enzyme assay test for TSD was discovered and developed in the late 1960s and early 1970s, providing one of the first "mass screening" tools in medical genetics. It became a research and public health model for understanding and preventing all autosomal genetic disorders.

Tay–Sachs disease, AB variant, and Sandhoff disease might easily have been defined together as a single disease, because the three disorders are associated with failure of the same metabolic pathway and have the same outcome. Classification and naming for many genetic disorders reflects history, because most diseases were first observed and classified based on biochemistry and pathophysiology before genetic diagnosis was available. However, the three GM2 gangliosidoses were discovered and named separately. Each represents a distinct molecular point of failure in a subunit that is required for activation of the enzyme.

== Tay–Sachs disease ==
Tay–Sachs disease is a rare autosomal recessive genetic disorder that causes a progressive deterioration of nerve cells and of mental and physical abilities that begins around six months of age and usually results in death by the age of four. It is the most common of the GM2 gangliosidoses. The disease occurs when harmful quantities of cell membrane gangliosides accumulate in the brain's nerve cells, eventually leading to the premature death of the cells.

== Sandhoff disease ==
Sandhoff disease is a rare, autosomal recessive metabolic disorder that causes progressive destruction of nerve cells in the brain and spinal cord. The disease results from mutations on chromosome 5 in the HEXB gene, critical for the lysosomal enzymes beta-N-acetylhexosaminidase A and B. Sandhoff disease is clinically indistinguishable from Tay–Sachs disease. The most common form, infantile Sandhoff disease, is usually fatal by early childhood.

== AB variant ==
GM2-gangliosidosis, AB variant is a rare, autosomal recessive metabolic disorder that causes progressive destruction of nerve cells in the brain and spinal cord. Mutations in the GM2A gene cause AB variant. The GM2A gene provides instructions for making a protein called the GM2 activator. This protein is a cofactor that is required for the normal function of beta-hexosaminidase A. The disease is usually fatal by early childhood.

== Treatment ==
There are no authorized therapies for the treatment of the GM2 Gangliosidosis (Tay-Sachs and Sandhoff disease). The current standard of care for GM2 Gangliosidosis disease is limited to supportive care and aimed at providing adequate nutrition and hydration.

This supportive care may substantially improve the quality of life of people affected by GM2. The therapeutic team may include specialists in neurology, pulmonology, gastroenterology, psychiatrist, orthopaedics, nutrition, physical therapy and occupational therapy.

=== N-Acetyl-Leucine ===
N-Acetyl-Leucine is an orally administered, modified amino acid that is being developed as a novel treatment for multiple rare and common neurological disorders by IntraBio Inc (Oxford, United Kingdom).

N-Acetyl-Leucine has been granted multiple orphan drug designations from the U.S. Food & Drug Administration (FDA) and the European Medicines Agency (EMA) and the European Medicines Agency (EMA) for the treatment of a various genetic diseases, including GM2 Gangliosidosis (Tay-Sachs and Sandhoff). The US FDA has granted IntraBio a Rare Pediatric Disease Designation for N-Acetyl-Leucine for the treatment of GM2 Gangliosidosis.

Compassionate use studies in both Tay-Sachs and Sandhoff patients have demonstrated the positive clinical effects of treatment with N-Acetyl-Leucine for GM2 Gangliosidosis These studies further demonstrated that the treatment is well tolerated, with a good safety profile.

A multinational clinical trial investigating N-Acetyl-L-Leucine for the treatment of GM2 Gangliosidosis (Tay-Sachs and Sandhoff) began in 2019 Recruitment is ongoing.

IntraBio is also conducting parallel clinical trials with N-Acetyl-L-Leucine for the treatment of Niemann-Pick disease type C and Ataxia-Telangiectasia. Future opportunities to develop N-Acetyl-Leucine include Lewy body dementia, amyotrophic lateral sclerosis, restless leg syndrome, multiple sclerosis, and migraine.

== See also ==
- GM2 (ganglioside)
