= 1-Deoxysphingolipids =

Class of toxic sphingolipids involved in neurological and metabolic disorders

The 1-deoxysphingolipids (1-deoxySLs) are a recently identified class of atypical sphingolipids (SLs). They are produced via a non-canonical biosynthetic pathway, and their defining feature, the absence of a C1 hydroxyl group (C1-OH), prevents their further conversion into complex sphingolipids.

Under normal conditions, sphingolipids are synthesized through a reaction catalyzed by the enzyme serine-palmitoyltransferase (SPT), which condenses serine with palmitoyl-CoA. However, when SPT utilizes alternative amino acid substrates such as alanine or glycine instead of serine, it leads to the formation of 1-deoxySLs.

Unlike canonical sphingolipids, 1-deoxysphingolipids cannot be degraded via standard catabolic pathways. As a result, they accumulate to high levels and have been implicated in a range of neurological and metabolic disorders.

== Structure ==
There are two types of 1-deoxySLs: 1-deoxysphinganine and 1-deoxymethylsphinganine.

=== 1-Deoxysphinganine ===
1-Deoxysphinganine

Names
- Preferred IUPAC name (2S,3R)-2-Aminooctadecan-3-ol
- Other names Spisulosine

Identifiers
| CAS Number | 196497-48-0 |
| 3D model (JSmol) | Interactive image |
| PubChem CID | 9925886 |
| UNII | ZX5D253CYY |
- InChI: InChI=1S/C18H39NO/c1-3-4-5-6-7-8-9-10-11-12-13-14-15-16-18(20)17(2)19/h17-18,20H,3-16,19H2,1-2H3/t17-,18+/m0/s1 Key: YRYJJIXWWQLGGV-ZWKOTPCHSA-N
- SMILES: CCCCCCCCCCCCCCC[C@H]([C@H](C)N)O

Properties
| Chemical formula | C_{18}H_{39}NO |

It is an amino alcohol and a bioactive sphingoid. Its distinctive trait is that the terminal hydroxy group has been replaced by hydrogen. It possesses antineoplastic properties, appearing to inhibit the proliferation of some kinds of cancer.

This sphingoid base can be found, in general, in low levels, in animal cells, and at higher concentrations in the cell membranes of certain bacteria, including Bacteroides species common to the animal gut microbiome—suggesting this as a potential source of these compounds in circulation. It was found for the first time in a marine organism, in which context it is known as spisulosine. It is known by other names such as ES-285.

The molecular weight of this compound is 285,5 g/mol and its molecular formula is C_{18}H_{39}NO, which means it has 18 carbons.

=== 1-Deoxymethylsphinganine ===
1-Deoxymethylsphinganine

Names
- Preferred IUPAC name (2R)-1-Aminoheptadecan-2-ol
- Other names 1-Deoxymethylsphinganine (m17:0)

Identifiers
| CAS Number | 1219484-98-6 |
| 3D model (JSmol) | Interactive image |
| PubChem CID | 70678793 |
- InChI: InChI=1S/C17H37NO/c1-2-3-4-5-6-7-8-9-10-11-12-13-14-15-17(19)16-18/h17,19H,2-16,18H2,1H3/t17-/m1/s1 Key: UGVBFHUWZNNKIK-QGZVFWFLSA-N
- SMILES: CCCCCCCCCCCCCCC[C@H](CN)O

Properties
| Chemical formula | C_{17}H_{37}NO |

It is a bioactive sphingoid which derives from the sphinganine. It is formed by a sphingoid and an amino alcohol and it constitutes the conjugated base of 1-deoxymethylsphinganine (1+). Its role is accepting a hydron from a donor via its organic amino compound; it is a Brønsted base.

It is also known as deoxymethyl-SA, (2R)-1-aminoheptadecan-2-ol and 1-desoxymethylsphinganine.

The molecular weight of this compound is 271,48 g/mol and its molecular formula is C_{17}H_{37}NO, which means it has 17 carbons.

In relation to its appearance, it has a powder form. Other physical and chemical properties are not certainly known.

== Localization ==
Sphingolipid metabolism is based in compartmentalization. In this way, possible cycles of opposite anabolism and catabolism reactions are avoided.

The ER is the compartment where the synthesis of ceramide is produced. Then, it will move to the Golgi apparatus. If the ceramide transporter protein is involved, it will go to the TGN to form sphingomyelin. If the vesicles are the ones in charge of transport, it will reach the cis zone to become glucosylceramide.

Instead, deoxySL transport and localization in cells is not known for sure. It is true that several studies has proved some of his intracellular behaviours.

What allows to understand the distribution in the cell of 1-deoxysphingolipids is the comparison between the behavior of fluorescent analogs of the SLs (C6-NBD-(dh)-Cer) and the 1-deoxySLs (C6-NBD-deoxy(dh)-Cer). The fact that C6-NBD-deoxy(dh)-Cer is not located in the same compartments as C6-NBD-(dh)-Cer indicates that the absence of C1-OH interferes in the protein and vesicular traffic.

On the other side, it's been found that 1-deoxySLs gave a signal in the mitochondria and remained prominent by using alkyne-1-deoxySA, as well as the co-location in the RE and Golgi markers. The signal was absent in the lysosomes and in the plasma membrane.

A specific change in 1-deoxySLs causes variations in mitochondrial morphology, as well as variations of the same type in the RE when de concentrations are toxic.

== Metabolism ==
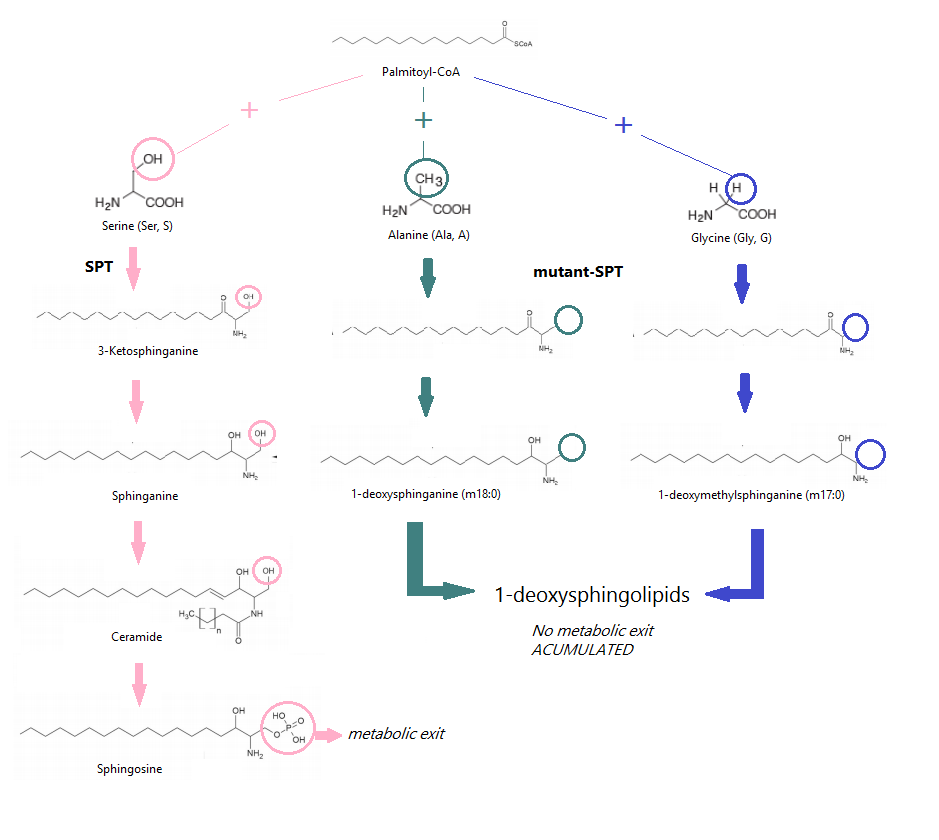
Differences depending on the substrate used by serine-palmitoyltransferase (SPT)

=== Synthesis ===
1-DeoxySLs has a similar pattern to sphingolipids during de novo synthesis. The reaction is catalyzed by the enzyme serine palmitoyltransferase (SPT) but instead of condensing palmitoyl-CoA and L-serine, the amino acid substrate is replaced by L-alanina or L-glycine.

This atypical sphingolipids are formed as the result of a mutated SPT (SPTLC1/SPTLC2) with alternative activities. It has also produced by wild-type of SPT under unfavorable conditions where the synthesis of L-serine is diminished and / or the biosynthesis of alanine and glycine is too high.

The result of the reaction with L-alanine forms 1-deoxysphinganine (1-deoxySA; m18:0), while the use of glycerin forms 1-deoxymethylsphinganine (1-deoxymethylSA; m17:0). Both molecules are 1-deoxySLs.

=== Degradation ===
Atypical sphingolipids' lack of C1-OH (hydroxyl group) of sphinganine its the cause they accumulate in the cytoplasm and cannot be degraded. These headless sphingolipids are not able to be phosphorylated and they can neither converted into complex lipids as sphingomyelins and glycosphingolipids (galactosylceramides, gangliosides, cerebrosides ...). Instead, they have toxic effects to the cell.

Despite previous opinions that 1-deoxySLs are dead-end metabolites, new researches prove the opposite. Its concentrations decrease over time because atypical sphingolipids convert into downstream products, which normally are polyunsaturated and polyhydroxylated. The main reason for this transformation is detoxification. The enzymes involved in this process produce the change within several days, making it a slow conversion. This take places in two stages:

- Firstly, the hydroxylation of compounds begins by cytochrome P450 enzymes.
- Secondly, hydrophilic moieties join up to the compounds in order to increase water solubility. As a result, the excretion through urine occurs and compounds can be removed.

Either CYP4A or CYP4F are the enzymes involved in the downstream metabolism of 1-deoxySLs. It is not yet known which one takes place in the process but, it is more likely to be CYP4F as in mouse experiments this enzyme is responsible for 1-deoxySLs formation.

== Physico-chemical properties ==
Currently, there is still much to elucidate regarding the properties of 1-deoxysphingolipids. However, studies have already contributed with clarifications on their biophysical properties and resulting biological impact. Systematic studies on the properties of each 1-deoxysphingolipid are still needed but, we already have some important hints.

The most remarkable structural differences between canonical sphingolipids and 1-deoxysphingolipids occur at the level of the sphingoid base, namely the lack of C1-OH and the double bond position and configuration. The missing C1 hydroxyl group is an important characteristic that influences the molecule's intra and intermolecular interactions, as its ability to form intra and intermolecular H-bond networks decreases with a consequent impact on membranes biophysical properties and integrity. The lack of the canonical trans double bond impacts the main transition temperature of the lipid. The more bulky cis double bound present at a deeper position of the sphingoid base increases the surface area of the lipid further reducing the strength of the H-bond network formed with the neighbouring molecules potentially disrupting membrane stability and function.

These structural differences reduce the ability of the lipid to segregate laterally and form ordered domains important for many biological functions. This can contribute to the development and progression of pathological scenarios.

== Function ==
Up until now, sphingolipids functions have not been yet known. In any case, its danger contributes to the development of several neuropathies and diseases.

=== Toxicity ===
There are some diseases which causes are due to the formation of 1-deoxySLs and doxSA. For example, HSAN1 is caused because of the formation of this atypical and neurotoxic sphingolipid metabolites (doxSA and 1-deoxySLs). Moreover, it has been found that patients with type 2 diabetes, autonomic neuropathy type 1 (HSAN1) and hereditary sensory have elevated number of this kind of sphingolipids in their plasma. There are some investigations that affirm that plasma concentrations in patients with diabetes or the metabolic syndrome were higher than the control group's concentrations. The increase of 1-deoxySLs in metabolic disorders is curiously related to a fatty acid and carbohydrate metabolic dysregulation, that also affects to L-serine metabolism.

We are capable to synthesize an alkyne analog of 1-deoxysphinganine (doxSA), which is the metabolic precursor of all deoxySLs. This is useful for us to trace the metabolism of deoxySLs. With this information, now we are able to know that the metabolism of this lipid is restricted to only some lipid species.

Considering the fact that we do not know much of the 1-deoxySL, there are some investigations that try to find a possible treatment for the diseases caused by this sphingolipid. In some of the experiments, there are hypothesis about a possible diabetic neuropathy treatment. This one consists in an oral L-serine supplementation since it has been demonstrated that this substance lowered 1-deoxySL concentrations in plasma.
