= HEXB =

Protein-coding gene in the species Homo sapiens

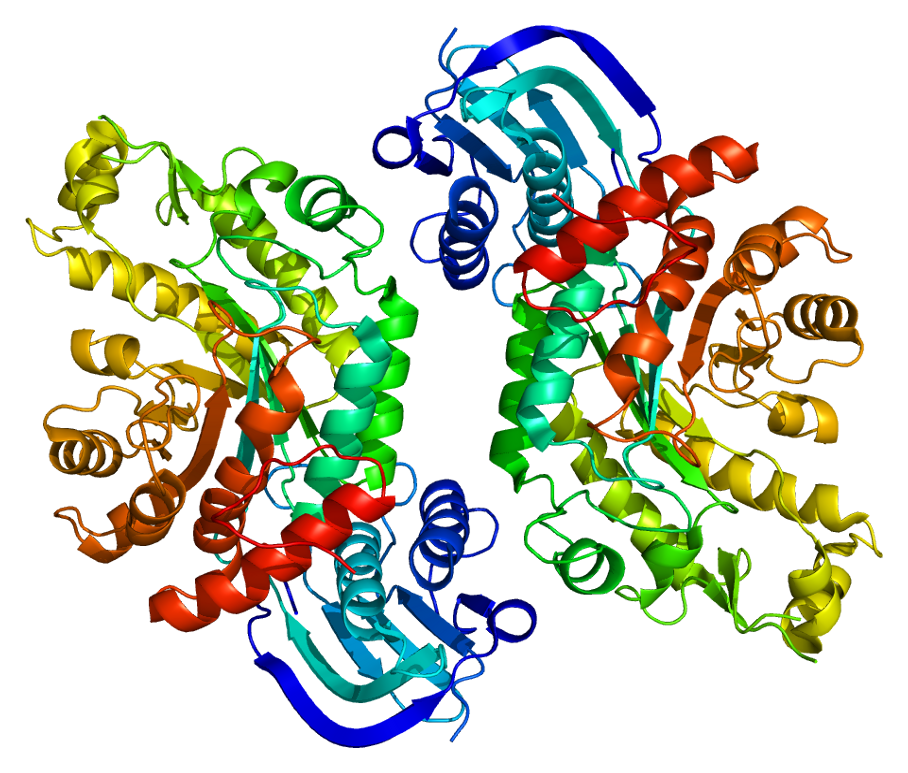

Identifiers
- Aliases: HEXB, ENC-1AS, HEL-248, HEL-S-111, hexosaminidase subunit beta
- External IDs: OMIM: 606873; MGI: 96074; GeneCards: HEXB
Available structures
PDB	Ortholog search: PDBe RCSB
PDB	List of PDB id codes 1NOU, 1NOW, 1NP0, 1O7A, 2GJX, 2GK1, 3LMY, 5BRO
Enzyme activity
EC #	BRENDA	ExPASy	KEGG	MetaCyc
3.2.1.52	↗	↗	↗	↗

Gene location (Human)
Chr.	Chromosome 5 (human)
Band	5q13.3	Start	74,640,023 bp
Band	5q13.3	End	74,722,647 bp

Gene location (Mouse)
Chr.	Chromosome 13 (mouse)
Band	13 D1|13 50.66 cM	Start	97,312,839 bp
Band	13 D1|13 50.66 cM	End	97,334,865 bp
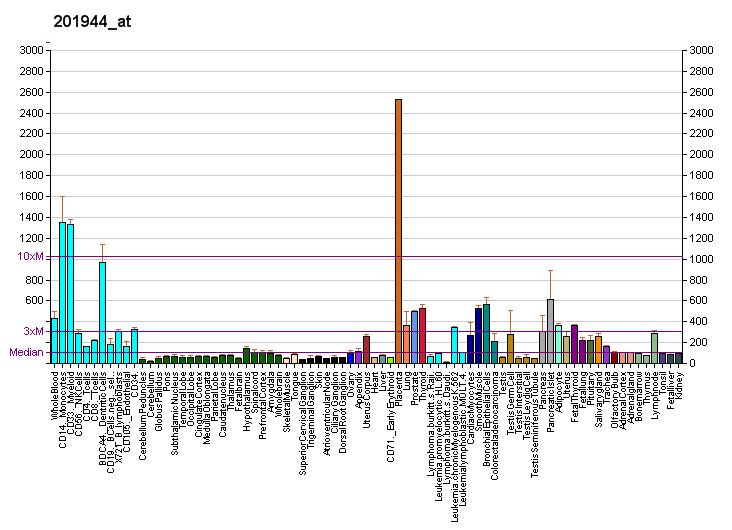
RNA expression pattern
Bgee	Human / Mouse (ortholog); Top expressed in: placenta; stromal cell of endometrium; Achilles tendon; decidua; monocyte; islet of Langerhans; beta cell; tendon of biceps brachii; corpus epididymis; synovial joint / Top expressed in: lacrimal gland; epithelium of small intestine; submandibular gland; left colon; transitional epithelium of urinary bladder; calvaria; parotid gland; body of femur; ciliary body; globus pallidus; More reference expression data
BioGPS	More reference expression data
Gene ontology
Molecular function	acetylglucosaminyltransferase activity; hydrolase activity, hydrolyzing O-glycosyl compounds; protein homodimerization activity; hydrolase activity, acting on glycosyl bonds; beta-N-acetylhexosaminidase activity; protein heterodimerization activity; hydrolase activity; N-acetyl-beta-D-galactosaminidase activity; protein binding
Cellular component	membrane; azurophil granule; acrosomal vesicle; lysosomal lumen; lysosome; extracellular exosome; extracellular region; extracellular space; azurophil granule lumen
Biological process	skeletal system development; hyaluronan catabolic process; sexual reproduction; glycosphingolipid metabolic process; locomotory behavior; neuromuscular process controlling balance; astrocyte cell migration; lipid storage; cellular calcium ion homeostasis; hearing; regulation of cellular metabolic process; single fertilization; oogenesis; neuromuscular process; male courtship behavior; keratan sulfate catabolic process; regulation of cell shape; phospholipid biosynthetic process; chondroitin sulfate catabolic process; myelination; oligosaccharide catabolic process; metabolism; lysosome organization; penetration of zona pellucida; ganglioside catabolic process; positive regulation of transcription by RNA polymerase II; glycosaminoglycan metabolic process; neutrophil degranulation; carbohydrate metabolic process
Sources:Amigo / QuickGO
Orthologs
Databases	NCBI: entry; OMA: entry
Species	Human	Mouse
Entrez	3074	15212
Ensembl	ENSG00000049860	ENSMUSG00000021665
UniProt	P07686	P20060
RefSeq (mRNA)	NM_001292004; NM_000521	NM_010422
RefSeq (protein)	NP_000512; NP_001278933	NP_034552
Location (UCSC)	Chr 5: 74.64 – 74.72 Mb	Chr 13: 97.31 – 97.33 Mb
PubMed search
- Wikidata
View/Edit Human	View/Edit Mouse

Beta-hexosaminidase subunit beta is an enzyme that in humans is encoded by the HEXB gene.

Hexosaminidase B is the beta subunit of the lysosomal enzyme beta-hexosaminidase that, together with the cofactor GM2 activator protein, catalyzes the degradation of the ganglioside GM2, and other molecules containing terminal N-acetyl hexosamines. Beta-hexosaminidase is composed of two subunits, alpha and beta, which are encoded by separate genes. Both beta-hexosaminidase alpha and beta subunits are members of family 20 of glycosyl hydrolases. Mutations in the alpha or beta subunit genes lead to an accumulation of GM2 ganglioside in neurons and neurodegenerative disorders termed the GM2 gangliosidoses. Beta subunit gene mutations lead to Sandhoff disease (GM2-gangliosidosis type II).

== Structure ==
=== Gene ===
The HEXB gene lies on the chromosome location of 5q13.3 and consists of 14 exons, spanning 35-40Kb.

=== Protein ===
HEXB consists of 556 amino acid residues and weighs 63111Da.

== Function ==
HEXB is one of the two subunits forming β-hexosaminidase which functions as a glycosyl hydrolase that remove β-linked nonreducing-terminal GalNAc or GlcNAc residues in the lysosome. Inability of HEXB will lead toβ-hexosaminidase defect and result in a group of recessive disorders called GM2 gangliosidoses, characterized by the accumulation of GM2 ganglioside.

== Clinical significance ==
Genetic defects in HEXB can result in the accumulation of GM2 ganglioside in neural tissues and two of three lysosomal storage diseases collectively known as GM2 gangliosidosis, of which Sandhoff disease (defects in the β subunit) is the best studied one. Patients present with neurosomatic manifestations. Therapeutic effects of Hex subunit gene transduction have been examined on Sandhoff disease model mice. Intracerebroventricular administration of the modified β-hexosaminidase B to Sandhoff mode mice restored the β-hexosaminidase activity in the brains, and reduced the GM2 ganglioside storage in the parenchyma.

== Interactions ==
HEXB has been found to interact with HEXA and ganglioside.
