= Serine C-palmitoyltransferase =

Class of enzymes

serine C-palmitoyltransferase

Identifiers
- EC no.: 2.3.1.50
- CAS no.: 62213-50-7

Databases
- IntEnz: IntEnz view
- BRENDA: BRENDA entry
- ExPASy: NiceZyme view
- KEGG: KEGG entry
- MetaCyc: metabolic pathway
- PRIAM: profile
- PDB structures: RCSB PDB PDBe PDBsum
- Gene Ontology: AmiGO / QuickGO
Search
- PMC: articles
- PubMed: articles
- NCBI: proteins

Serine palmitoyltransferase
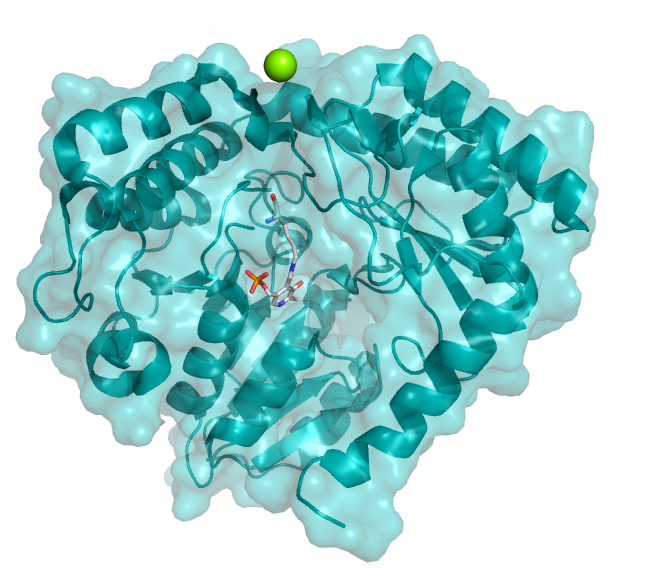
- Crystallographic structure of serine palmitoyltransferase from S. paucimobilis. The cofactor PLP is visible in the center.

Identifiers
- Symbol: SPT1
- PDB: 2JG2
- UniProt: Q93UV0

Other data
- EC number: 2.3.1.50
Search for
- Structures: Swiss-model
- Domains: InterPro

serine palmitoyltransferase, long chain base subunit 1

Identifiers
- Symbol: SPTLC1
- Alt. symbols: HSN1
- NCBI gene: 10558
- HGNC: 11277
- OMIM: 605712
- RefSeq: NM_006415
- UniProt: O15269

Other data
- EC number: 2.3.1.50
- Locus: Chr. 9 q22.31
Search for
- Structures: Swiss-model
- Domains: InterPro

serine palmitoyltransferase, long chain base subunit 2

Identifiers
- Symbol: SPTLC2
- NCBI gene: 9517
- HGNC: 11278
- OMIM: 605713
- RefSeq: NM_004863
- UniProt: O15270

Other data
- EC number: 2.3.1.50
- Locus: Chr. 14 q24.3
Search for
- Structures: Swiss-model
- Domains: InterPro

serine palmitoyltransferase, long chain base subunit 3

Identifiers
- Symbol: SPTLC3
- Alt. symbols: C20orf38, SPTLC2L
- NCBI gene: 55304
- HGNC: 16253
- OMIM: 611120
- RefSeq: NM_018327
- UniProt: Q9NUV7

Other data
- EC number: 2.3.1.50
- Locus: Chr. 20 p12.1
Search for
- Structures: Swiss-model
- Domains: InterPro

In enzymology, a serine C-palmitoyltransferase (EC 2.3.1.50) is an enzyme that catalyzes the chemical reaction:

palmitoyl-CoA + L-serine $\rightleftharpoons$ CoA + 3-dehydro-D-sphinganine + CO_{2}

Thus, the two substrates of this enzyme are palmitoyl-CoA and L-serine, whereas its 3 products are CoA, 3-dehydro-D-sphinganine, and CO_{2}. This reaction is a key step in the biosynthesis of sphingosine which is a precursor of many other sphingolipids.

This enzyme participates in sphingolipid metabolism. It employs one cofactor, pyridoxal phosphate.

== Nomenclature ==
This enzyme belongs to the family of transferases, specifically those acyltransferases transferring groups other than aminoacyl groups. The systematic name of this enzyme class is palmitoyl-CoA:L-serine C-palmitoyltransferase (decarboxylating). Other names in common use include:

- serine palmitoyltransferase,
- SPT, 3-oxosphinganine synthetase, and
- acyl-CoA:serine C-2 acyltransferase decarboxylating.

== Structure ==
Serine C-palmitoyltransferase is a member of the AOS (a-oxoamine synthase) family of PLP-dependent enzymes, which catalyse the condensation of amino acids and acyl-CoA thioester substrates. The human enzyme is a heterodimer consisting of two monomeric subunits known as long chain base 1 and 2 (LCB1/2) encoded by separate genes. The active site of LCB2 contains lysine and other key catalytic residues that are not present in LCB1, which does not participate in catalysis but is nevertheless required for the synthesis and stability of the enzyme.

As of late 2007, two structures have been solved for this class of enzymes, with PDB accession codes 2JG2 and 2JGT.

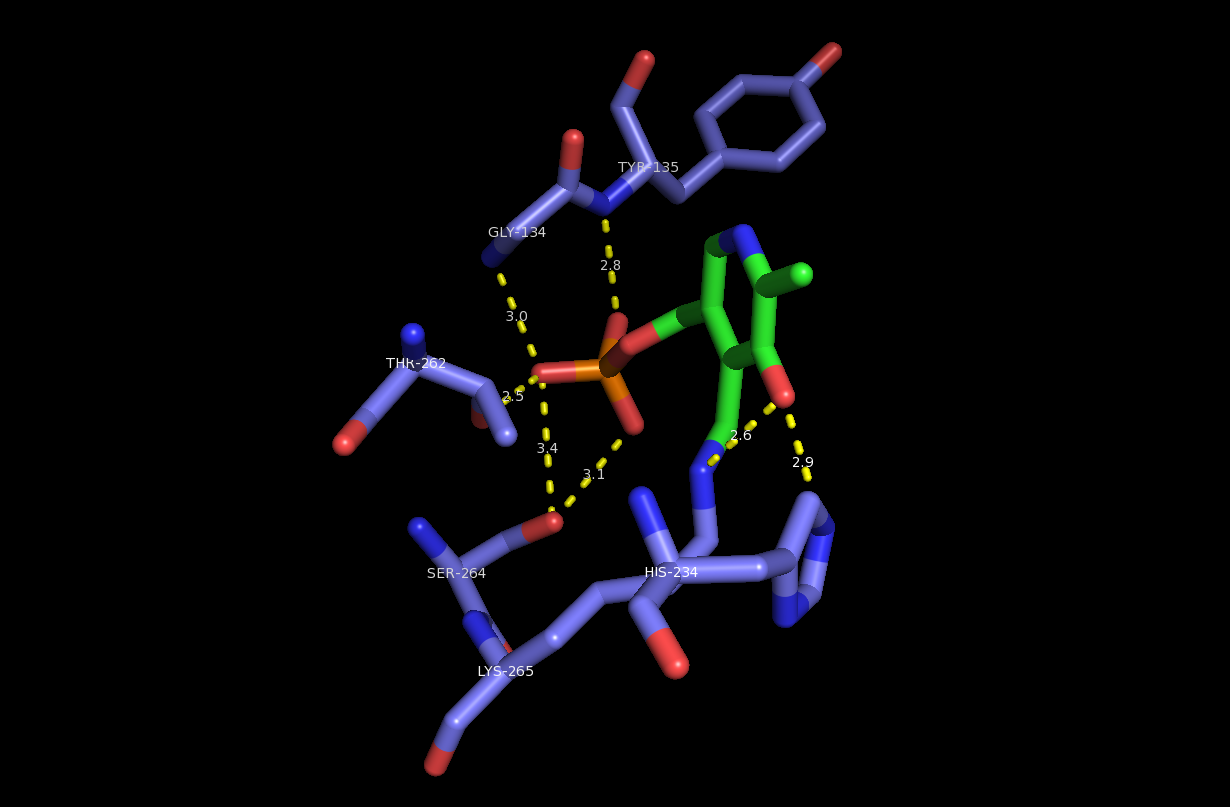
Key active site residues of serine C-palmitoyltransferase that interact with PLP. Generated from 2JG2.

== Mechanism ==
The PLP (pyridoxal 5′-phosphate)-dependent serine C-palmitoyltransferase carries out the first enzymatic step of de novo sphingolipid biosynthesis. The enzyme catalyses a Claisen-like condensation between L-serine and an acyl-CoA thioester (CoASH) substrate (typically C^{16}-palmitoyl) or an acyl-ACP (acyl-carrier protein) thioester substrate, to form 3-ketodihydrosphingosine. Initially PLP cofactor is bound to the active-site lysine via a Schiff base to form the holo-form or internal aldimine of the enzyme. The amine group of L-serine then attacks and displaces the lysine bound to PLP, forming the external aldimine intermediate. Subsequently, deprotonation occurs at the Cα of serine, forming the quinonoid intermediate that attacks the incoming thioester substrate. Following decarboxylation and lysine attack, the product 3-keto-dihydrosphingosine is released and catalytically active PLP is reformed. This condensation reaction forms the sphingoid base or long-chain base found in all subsequent intermediate sphingolipids and complex sphingolipids in the organism.

== Isoforms ==
A variety of different serine C-palmitoyltransferase isoforms exist across different species. Unlike in eukaryotes, where the enzyme is heterodimeric and membrane bound, bacterial enzymes are homodimers and cytoplasmic. Studies of the isoform of the enzyme found in the Gram-negative bacterium Sphingomonas paucimobilis were the first to elucidate the structure of the enzyme, revealing that PLP cofactor is held in place by several active site residues including Lys^{265} and His^{159}. Specifically, the S. paucimobilis isoform features an active-site arginine residue (Arg^{378}) that plays a key role in stabilizing the carboxy moiety of the PLP-L-serine external aldimine intermediate. Similar arginine residues in enzyme homologues (Arg^{370}, Arg^{390}) play analogous roles. Other homologues, such as in Sphingobacterium multivorum, feature the carboxy moiety bound to serine and methionine residues via water in place of arginine. Certain enzyme homologues, such as in S. multivorum as well as Bdellovibrio stolpii, are found to be associated with the inner cell membrane, thus resembling the eukaryotic enzymes. The B. stolpii homologue also features substrate inhibition by palmitoyl-CoA, a feature shared by the yeast and mammalian homologues.

== Clinical significance ==
HSAN1 (hereditary sensory and autonomic neuropathy type 1) is a genetic disorder caused by mutations in either one of SPTLC1 or SPTLC2, genes encoding the two heterodimeric subunits of the eukaryotic serine C-palmitoyltransferase enzyme. These mutations have been shown to alter active site specificity, specifically by enhancing the ability of the enzyme to condense L-alanine with the palmitoyl-CoA substrate. This is consistent with elevated levels of deoxysphingoid bases formed by the condensation of alanine with palmitoyl-CoA observed in HSAN1 patients.

== Species distribution ==
Serine C-palmitoyltransferase is expressed in a large number of species from bacteria to humans. The bacterial enzyme is a water-soluble homodimer whereas in eukaryotes the enzyme is a heterodimer which is anchored to the endoplasmic reticulum. Humans and other mammals express three paralogous subunits SPTLC1, SPTLC2, and SPTLC3. It was originally proposed that the functional human enzyme is a heterodimer between a SPTLC1 subunit and a second subunit which is either SPTLC2 or SPTLC3. However more recent data suggest that the enzyme may exist as a larger complex, possibly an octamer, comprising all three subunits.
