= SPTLC2 =

Protein-coding gene in the species Homo sapiens

Identifiers
- Aliases: SPTLC2, HSN1C, LCB2, LCB2A, NSAN1C, SPT2, hLCB2a, serine palmitoyltransferase long chain base subunit 2
- External IDs: OMIM: 605713; MGI: 108074; HomoloGene: 21610; GeneCards: SPTLC2; OMA:SPTLC2 - orthologs

Gene location (Human)
Chr.	Chromosome 14 (human)
Band	14q24.3	Start	77,505,997 bp
Band	14q24.3	End	77,616,637 bp

Gene location (Mouse)
Chr.	Chromosome 12 (mouse)
Band	12|12 D2	Start	87,351,832 bp
Band	12|12 D2	End	87,435,129 bp
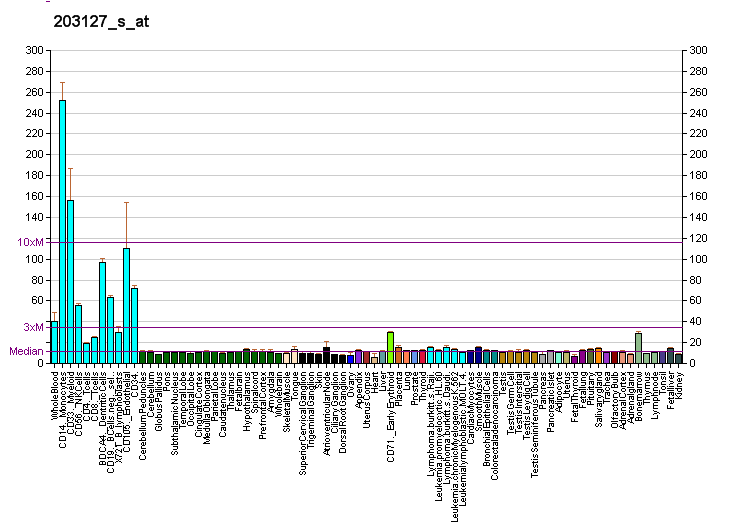

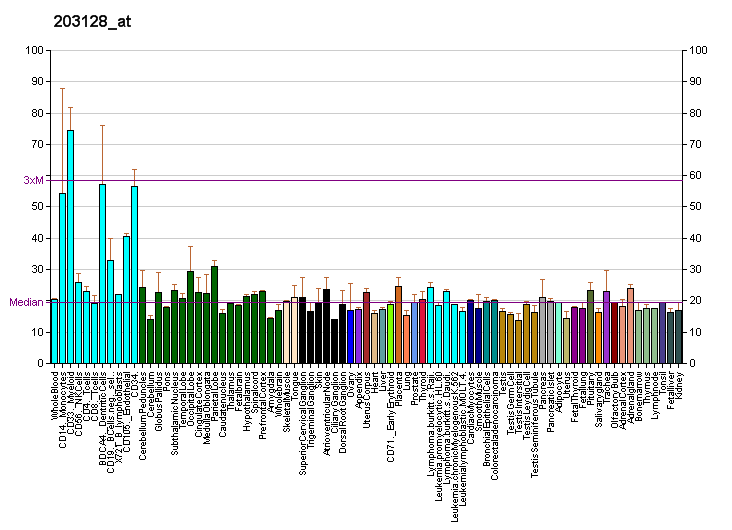
RNA expression pattern
Bgee	Human / Mouse (ortholog); Top expressed in: corpus callosum; inferior ganglion of vagus nerve; internal globus pallidus; monocyte; subthalamic nucleus; C1 segment; stromal cell of endometrium; buccal mucosa cell; pars reticulata; blood / Top expressed in: decidua; gastrula; genital tubercle; granulocyte; duodenum; tail of embryo; ileum; gastric mucosa; mucous cell of stomach; epithelium of stomach; More reference expression data
BioGPS	More reference expression data
Gene ontology
Molecular function	transferase activity; catalytic activity; serine C-palmitoyltransferase activity; pyridoxal phosphate binding; acyltransferase activity
Cellular component	integral component of membrane; serine C-palmitoyltransferase complex; endoplasmic reticulum membrane; membrane; endoplasmic reticulum; mitochondrion
Biological process	lipid metabolism; sphinganine biosynthetic process; sphingosine biosynthetic process; sphingolipid biosynthetic process; biosynthesis; sphingomyelin biosynthetic process; positive regulation of lipophagy; metabolism; ceramide biosynthetic process; sphingolipid metabolic process; adipose tissue development
Sources:Amigo / QuickGO
Orthologs
Species	Human	Mouse
Entrez	9517	20773
Ensembl	ENSG00000100596	ENSMUSG00000021036
UniProt	O15270	P97363
RefSeq (mRNA)	NM_004863	NM_011479
RefSeq (protein)	NP_004854; NP_004854.1	NP_035609
Location (UCSC)	Chr 14: 77.51 – 77.62 Mb	Chr 12: 87.35 – 87.44 Mb
PubMed search
- Wikidata
View/Edit Human	View/Edit Mouse

Serine palmitoyltransferase, long chain base subunit 2, also known as SPTLC2, is a protein which in humans is encoded by the SPTLC2 gene. SPTLC2 belongs to the class-II pyridoxal-phosphate-dependent aminotransferase family.

== Function ==
SPTLC2 encodes a long chain base subunit of serine palmitoyltransferase (SPT). The heterodimer formed with LCB1/SPTLC1 constitutes the catalytic core. It catalyzes the pyridoxal 5'-phosphate dependent condensation of L-serine with an acyl-CoA thioester to yield an amino alcohol. The composition of the SPT complex determines the substrate preference. The SPTLC1-SPTLC2-SPTSSA complex shows a strong preference for C16-CoA substrate, while the SPTLC1-SPTLC2-SPTSSB complex displays a preference for C18-CoA substrate.

The SPT complex synthesizes molecules used in various biological processes. For example, sphingosine, an 18-carbon amino alcohol with an unsaturated hydrocarbon chain, can be phosphorylated via sphingosine kinase. The resulting sphingosine-1-phosphate is a potent signaling lipid. Sphingosine is also a substrate for the synthesis of various other molecules including, ceramides, sphingomyelin, cerebrosides and globosides.

Epidermal ceramides are critical for normal skin barrier function and SPTLC2 is differentially expressed across body sites to regulate epidermal ceramide composition. In particular, SPTLC2 is upregulated in acral granular layer keratinocytes.

== Tissue distribution ==
SPTLC2 is widely expressed in all tissues.

== Clinical significance ==
Mutations in SPTLC2 were identified in patients with hereditary sensory neuropathy type I.

In response to IL-17A and TNF, SPTLC2 is highly upregulated in psoriasis and is likely responsible for some of the epidermal ceramide alterations seen in psoriasis plaques.

Alternatively spliced variants encoding different isoforms of SPTLC2 have been identified.

SPTLC2 expression is highly increased at the protein level in brains of patients with Alzheimer's disease. No changes are observed at the mRNA level.
