= Anat Blumenfeld =

Israeli biochemist

Anat Blumenfeld (Hebrew: ענַת בּלומנפֶלד) is an Israeli researcher biochemist at Hadassah Medical Center in Jerusalem.

Blumenfeld discovered a chromosome responsible for the serious disease Familial dysautonomia which affects the nerves of fetuses. About 100 families in Israel of Ashkenazi Jewish origin have one or more children with the disease, and they suffer from nausea, high blood pressure, and some food entering their lungs. Dr. Blumenfeld says the disease was discovered about 40 years ago, but researchers did not know what caused it and whether it was genetic. She collected blood specimens for three years from the affected families and checked all their chromosomes and identified No. 9 as causing the disease. Apart from the Hadassah Hospital in Jerusalem, where Blumenfeld works, the test is now used only in New York.

== See also ==
- Health care in Israel
