= NDST3 =

Enzyme

Identifiers
- Aliases: NDST3, HSST3, N-deacetylase/N-sulfotransferase 3, N-deacetylase and N-sulfotransferase 3
- External IDs: OMIM: 603950; MGI: 1932544; GeneCards: NDST3
Enzyme activity
| EC # | BRENDA | ExPASy | KEGG | MetaCyc |
|---|---|---|---|---|
| 2.8.2.8 | ↗ | ↗ | ↗ | ↗ |

Gene location (Human)
| Chr. | Chromosome 4 (human) |
| Band | 4q26 | Start | 118,033,618 bp |
| Band | 4q26 | End | 118,258,634 bp |

Gene location (Mouse)
| Chr. | Chromosome 3 (mouse) |
| Band | 3|3 G1 | Start | 123,319,815 bp |
| Band | 3|3 G1 | End | 123,484,502 bp |
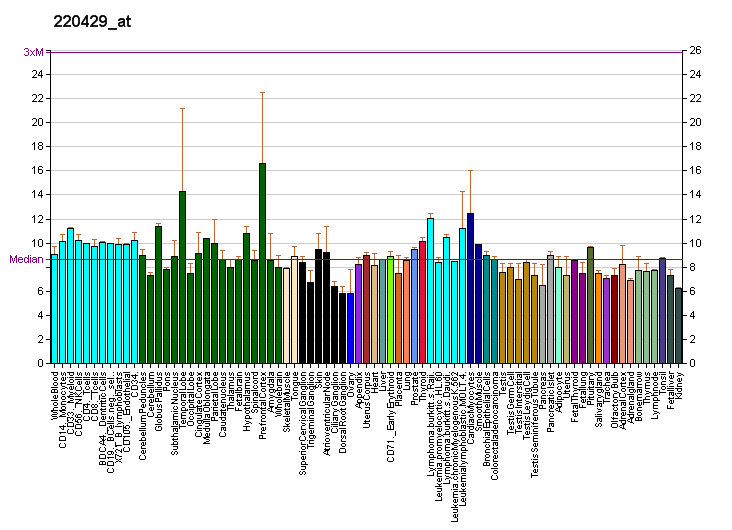
RNA expression pattern
| Bgee | Human / Mouse (ortholog); Top expressed in: buccal mucosa cell; cerebellar cortex; cerebellar hemisphere; testicle; right hemisphere of cerebellum; prefrontal cortex; ganglionic eminence; nucleus accumbens; Brodmann area 9; right frontal lobe / Top expressed in: cerebellar cortex; spermatid; primary visual cortex; seminiferous tubule; superior frontal gyrus; lumbar subsegment of spinal cord; neural layer of retina; inferior colliculi; dentate gyrus of hippocampal formation granule cell; cerebellar vermis; More reference expression data |
| BioGPS | More reference expression data |
Gene ontology
| Molecular function | transferase activity; sulfotransferase activity; catalytic activity; hydrolase activity; [heparan sulfate-glucosamine N-sulfotransferase activity]; heparan sulfate N-acetylglucosaminyltransferase activity; deacetylase activity; heparan sulfate sulfotransferase activity |
| Cellular component | integral component of membrane; Golgi membrane; Golgi apparatus; membrane; cellular component |
| Biological process | metabolism; heparin biosynthetic process; heparan sulfate proteoglycan biosynthetic process; heparan sulfate proteoglycan biosynthetic process, polysaccharide chain biosynthetic process; glycosaminoglycan biosynthetic process; sulfur compound metabolic process |
Sources:Amigo / QuickGO
Orthologs
| Databases | NCBI: entry; OMA: entry |
| Species | Human | Mouse |
| Entrez | 9348 | 83398 |
| Ensembl | ENSG00000164100 | ENSMUSG00000027977 |
| UniProt | O95803 | Q9EQH7 |
| RefSeq (mRNA) | NM_004784 | NM_001293682; NM_031186 |
| RefSeq (protein) | NP_004775 | NP_001280611; NP_112463 |
| Location (UCSC) | Chr 4: 118.03 – 118.26 Mb | Chr 3: 123.32 – 123.48 Mb |
| PubMed search |
- Wikidata
| View/Edit Human | View/Edit Mouse |

Bifunctional heparan sulfate N-deacetylase/N-sulfotransferase 3 is an enzyme that in humans is encoded by the NDST3 gene. It catalyses the reaction:

3'-phosphoadenylyl sulfate + α-D-glucosaminyl-[heparan sulfate]_{(n)} = adenosine 3',5'-bisphosphate + 2 H^{+} + N-sulfo-α-D-glucosaminyl-[heparan sulfate]_{(n)}

This is a step in the production of heparin.

== Clinical significance ==
Mutations in NDST3 have been linked to schizophrenia.
