= DDX11 =

Protein-coding gene in humans

Identifiers
- Aliases: DDX11, CHL1, CHLR1, KRG2, WABS, DEAD/H-box helicase 11
- External IDs: OMIM: 601150; MGI: 2443590; GeneCards: DDX11
Enzyme activity
EC #	BRENDA	ExPASy	KEGG	MetaCyc
5.6.2.3	↗	↗	↗	↗

Gene location (Human)
Chr.	Chromosome 12 (human)
Band	12p11.21	Start	31,073,860 bp
Band	12p11.21	End	31,104,799 bp

Gene location (Mouse)
Chr.	Chromosome 17 (mouse)
Band	17|17 E1.1	Start	66,430,515 bp
Band	17|17 E1.1	End	66,459,169 bp
RNA expression pattern
Bgee	Human / Mouse (ortholog); Top expressed in: mucosa of transverse colon; body of pancreas; left ovary; body of uterus; right ovary; apex of heart; lymph node; left testis; ventricular zone; spleen / Top expressed in: primary oocyte; hand; spermatocyte; secondary oocyte; Paneth cell; zygote; epiblast; ventricular zone; tail of embryo; renal corpuscle; More reference expression data
BioGPS	n/a
Gene ontology
Molecular function	4 iron, 4 sulfur cluster binding; nucleotide binding; helicase activity; iron-sulfur cluster binding; metal ion binding; single-stranded DNA binding; hydrolase activity, acting on acid anhydrides, in phosphorus-containing anhydrides; protein binding; RNA binding; nucleic acid binding; double-stranded DNA binding; hydrolase activity; ATP binding; DNA binding; chromatin binding; DNA replication origin binding; single-stranded RNA binding; DNA helicase activity; ATP-dependent activity, acting on DNA; ATP-dependent activity, acting on RNA; triplex DNA binding; G-quadruplex DNA binding
Cellular component	nucleolus; extracellular exosome; nucleus; spindle pole; fibrillar center; nucleoplasm; chromosome; cytoplasm; centrosome; microtubule organizing center; cytoskeleton; midbody; mitotic cohesin complex; Ctf18 RFC-like complex
Biological process	sister chromatid cohesion; IRE1-mediated unfolded protein response; viral process; nucleobase-containing compound metabolic process; DNA replication; DNA repair; transcription, DNA-templated; regulation of transcription, DNA-templated; cellular response to DNA damage stimulus; multicellular organism development; replication fork processing; positive regulation of endodeoxyribonuclease activity; negative regulation of protein binding; DNA duplex unwinding; positive regulation of chromatin binding; G-quadruplex DNA unwinding; positive regulation of sister chromatid cohesion; cellular response to hydroxyurea; cellular response to cisplatin; positive regulation of transcription of nucleolar large rRNA by RNA polymerase I; cellular response to bleomycin; nucleolar chromatin organization; positive regulation of double-strand break repair; establishment of sister chromatid cohesion
Sources:Amigo / QuickGO
Orthologs
Databases	NCBI: entry; OMA: entry
Species	Human	Mouse
Entrez	1663	320209
Ensembl	ENSG00000013573	ENSMUSG00000035842
UniProt	Q96FC9	Q6AXC6
RefSeq (mRNA)	NM_001257144; NM_001257145; NM_004399; NM_030653; NM_030655 NM_152438	NM_001003919; NM_001348292
RefSeq (protein)	NP_001244073; NP_001244074; NP_004390; NP_085911; NP_689651	NP_001003919; NP_001335221
Location (UCSC)	Chr 12: 31.07 – 31.1 Mb	Chr 17: 66.43 – 66.46 Mb
PubMed search
- Wikidata
View/Edit Human	View/Edit Mouse

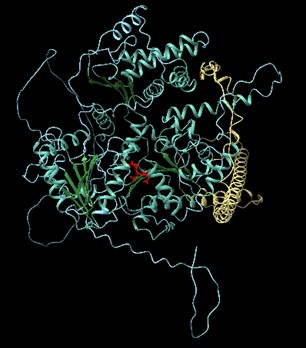
ChimeraX generated image of DDX11 isoform 1 from AlphaFold (AFQ96FC9-F1) sequence. E2 binding site in beige, DEAH box in red.

ATP-dependent DNA/RNA helicase DDX11 is an enzyme that in humans is encoded by the DDX11 gene. DDX11 is found within chromosome 12’s repetitive region. Its function as a helicase was determined from its structure.

== Function ==
This helicase is then regulated by long noncoding RNA and its ability to dismantle DNA triplexes known. It works best in the positive direction of already split DNA - commonly the duplex form. DDX11's role in sister chromatid cohesion is an active area of research.

== Structure ==
The structure of DDX11 is shown in the image where α-helices (blue) and β sheets (green) surround the DEAH box (red). The possible E2 binding domain was depicted in beige, this binding allows for papillomaviruses to persist in cells.

DEAD box proteins, characterized by the conserved motif Asp-Glu-Ala-Asp (DEAD), are putative RNA helicases. They are implicated in a number of cellular processes involving alteration of RNA secondary structure such as translation initiation, nuclear and mitochondrial splicing, and ribosome and spliceosome assembly. Based on their distribution patterns, some members of this family are believed to be involved in embryogenesis, spermatogenesis, and cellular growth and division. Alternative splicing results in multiple transcript variants encoding distinct isoforms.

== See also ==
- Warsaw breakage syndrome, genetic condition caused by mutation of the DDX11
