= Hereditary sensory and autonomic neuropathy =

- Specialty: Neurology

Hereditary sensory and autonomic neuropathy (HSAN) or hereditary sensory neuropathy (HSN) is a kind of disease which inhibits sensation.

This condition is less common than Charcot-Marie-Tooth disease.

== Classification ==
Eight different clinical entities have been described under hereditary sensory and autonomic neuropathies – all characterized by progressive loss of function that predominantly affects the peripheral sensory nerves. Their incidence has been estimated to be about 1 in 250,000.

=== Type 1 ===
Hereditary sensory neuropathy type 1 is a condition characterized by nerve abnormalities in the legs and feet (peripheral neuropathy). Many people with this condition have tingling, weakness, and a reduced ability to feel pain and sense hot and cold. Some affected individuals do not lose sensation, but instead feel shooting pains in their legs and feet. As the disorder progresses, the sensory abnormalities can affect the hands, arms, shoulders, and abdomen. Affected individuals may also experience muscle wasting and weakness as they get older, but this varies widely within families.

Affected individuals typically get open sores (ulcers) on their feet or hands or infections of the soft tissue of the fingertips (whitlows) that are slow to heal. Because affected individuals cannot feel the pain of these sores, they may not seek treatment right away. Without treatment, the ulcers can become infected and may require amputation of the surrounding area.

Albeit rarely, people with hereditary sensory neuropathy type 1 may develop hearing loss caused by abnormalities of the inner ear (sensorineural hearing loss).

The signs and symptoms of hereditary sensory neuropathy type 1 typically appear during a person's teens or twenties. While the features of this disorder tend to worsen over time, affected individuals have a normal life expectancy if signs and symptoms are properly treated.

Type 1 is the most common form among the 5 types of HSAN. Its historical names include mal perforant du pied, ulcero-mutilating neuropathy, hereditary perforating ulcers, familial trophoneurosis, familial syringomyelia, hereditary sensory radicular neuropathy, among others. This type includes a popular disease called Charcot-Marie-Tooth type 2B syndrome (HMSN 2B), which is also referred to as HSAN sub-type 1C.

Type 1 is inherited as an autosomal dominant trait. The disease usually starts during early adolescence or adulthood. The disease is characterized by the loss of pain sensation mainly in the distal parts of the lower limbs; that is, in the parts of the legs farther away from the center of the body. Since the affected individuals cannot feel pain, minor injuries in this area may not be immediately recognized and may develop into extensive ulcerations. Once infection occurs, further complications such as progressive destruction of underlying bones may follow and may necessitate amputation. In rare cases, the disease is accompanied with nerve deafness and muscle wasting. Autonomic disturbance, if present, appears as anhidrosis, a sweating abnormality. Examinations of the nerve structure and function showed signs of neuronal degeneration such as a marked reduction in the number of myelinated fibers and axonal loss. Sensory neurons lose the ability to transmit signals, while motor neurons has reduced ability to transmit signals.

==== Genes related to Hereditary sensory and autonomic neuropathy Type 1 ====
Mutations in the SPTLC1 gene cause hereditary sensory neuropathy type 1. The SPTLC1 gene provides instructions for making one part (subunit) of an enzyme called serine palmitoyltransferase (SPT). The SPT enzyme is involved in making certain fats called sphingolipids. Sphingolipids are important components of cell membranes and play a role in many cell functions.

SPTLC1 gene mutations reduce the amount of SPTLC1 subunit that is produced and result in an SPT enzyme with decreased function. A lack of functional SPT enzyme leads to a decrease in sphingolipid production and a harmful buildup of certain byproducts. Sphingolipids are found in myelin, which is the covering that protects nerves and promotes the efficient transmission of nerve impulses. A decrease in sphingolipids disrupts the formation of myelin, causing nerve cells to become less efficient and eventually die. When sphingolipids are not made, an accumulation of toxic byproducts can also lead to nerve cell death. This gradual destruction of nerve cells results in loss of sensation and muscle weakness in people with hereditary sensory neuropathy type 1.

=== Type 2, Congenital sensory neuropathy ===
Hereditary sensory and autonomic neuropathy type II (HSAN2) is a condition that primarily affects the sensory nerve cells (sensory neurons) which transmit information about sensations such as pain, temperature, and touch. These sensations are impaired in people with HSAN2. In some affected people, the condition may also cause mild abnormalities of the autonomic nervous system, which controls involuntary body functions such as heart rate, digestion, and breathing. The signs and symptoms of HSAN2 typically begin in infancy or early childhood.

The first sign of HSAN2 is usually numbness in the hands and feet. Soon after, affected individuals lose the ability to feel pain or sense hot and cold. People with HSAN2 often develop open sores (ulcers) on their hands and feet. Because affected individuals cannot feel the pain of these sores, they may not seek treatment right away. Without treatment, the ulcers can become infected and may lead to amputation of the affected area. Unintentional self-injury is common in people with HSAN2, typically by biting the tongue, lips, or fingers. These injuries may lead to spontaneous amputation of the affected areas. Affected individuals often have injuries and fractures in their hands, feet, limbs, and joints that go untreated because of the inability to feel pain. Repeated injury can lead to a condition called Charcot joints, in which the bones and tissue surrounding joints are destroyed.

The effects of HSAN2 on the autonomic nervous system are more variable. Some infants with HSAN2 have trouble sucking, which makes it difficult for them to eat. People with HSAN2 may experience episodes in which breathing slows or stops for short periods (apnea); digestive problems such as the backflow of stomach acids into the esophagus (gastroesophageal reflux); or slow eye blink or gag reflexes. Affected individuals may also have weak deep tendon reflexes, such as the reflex being tested when a doctor taps the knee with a hammer.

Some people with HSAN2 experience a diminished sense of taste due to the loss of a type of taste bud on the tip of the tongue called lingual fungiform papillae.

Type 2, congenital sensory neuropathy (also historically known as Morvan's disease), is characterized by onset of symptoms in early infancy or childhood. Upper & lower extremities are affected with chronic ulcerations and multiple injuries to fingers and feet. Pain sensation is affected predominantly and deep tendon reflexes are reduced. Autoamputation of the distal phalanges is common and so is neuropathic joint degeneration. The NCV shows reduced or absent sensory nerve action potentials and nerve biopsy shows total loss of myelinated fibers and reduced numbers of unmyelinated fibers. It is inherited as an autosomal recessive condition.

==== Genes related to Hereditary sensory and autonomic neuropathy Type 2 ====
There are two types of HSAN2, called HSAN2A and HSAN2B, each caused by mutations in a different gene. HSAN2A is caused by mutations in the WNK1 gene, and HSAN2B is caused by mutations in the RETREG1 gene (FAM134B). Although two different genes are involved, the signs and symptoms of HSAN2A and HSAN2B are the same.

The WNK1 gene provides instructions for making multiple versions (isoforms) of the WNK1 protein. HSAN2A is caused by mutations that affect a particular isoform called the WNK1/HSN2 protein. This protein is found in the cells of the nervous system, including nerve cells that transmit the sensations of pain, temperature, and touch (sensory neurons). The mutations involved in HSAN2A result in an abnormally short WNK1/HSN2 protein. Although the function of this protein is unknown, it is likely that the abnormally short version cannot function properly. People with HSAN2A have a reduction in the number of sensory neurons; however, the role that WNK1/HSN2 mutations play in that loss is unclear.

HSAN2B is caused by mutations in the RETREG1 gene. These mutations may lead to an abnormally short and nonfunctional protein. The RETREG1 protein is found in sensory and autonomic neurons. It is involved in the survival of neurons, particularly those that transmit pain signals, which are called nociceptive neurons. When the RETREG1 protein is nonfunctional, neurons die by a process of self-destruction called apoptosis.

The loss of neurons leads to the inability to feel pain, temperature, and touch sensations and to the impairment of the autonomic nervous system seen in people with HSAN2.

=== Type 3, Familial dysautonomia ===
Familial dysautonomia is a genetic disorder that affects the development and survival of certain nerve cells. The disorder disturbs cells in the autonomic nervous system, which controls involuntary actions such as digestion, breathing, production of tears, and the regulation of blood pressure and body temperature. It also affects the sensory nervous system, which controls activities related to the senses, such as taste and the perception of pain, heat, and cold. Familial dysautonomia is also called hereditary sensory and autonomic neuropathy, type III.

Problems related to this disorder first appear during infancy. Early signs and symptoms include poor muscle tone (hypotonia), feeding difficulties, poor growth, lack of tears, frequent lung infections, and difficulty maintaining body temperature. Older infants and young children with familial dysautonomia may hold their breath for prolonged periods of time, which may cause a bluish appearance of the skin or lips (cyanosis) or fainting. This breath-holding behavior usually stops by age 6. Developmental milestones, such as walking and speech, are usually delayed, although some affected individuals show no signs of developmental delay.

Additional signs and symptoms in school-age children include bed wetting, episodes of vomiting, reduced sensitivity to temperature changes and pain, poor balance, abnormal curvature of the spine (scoliosis), poor bone quality and increased risk of bone fractures, and kidney and heart problems. Affected individuals also have poor regulation of blood pressure. They may experience a sharp drop in blood pressure upon standing (orthostatic hypotension), which can cause dizziness, blurred vision, or fainting. They can also have episodes of high blood pressure when nervous or excited, or during vomiting incidents. About one-third of children with familial dysautonomia have learning disabilities, such as a short attention span, that require special education classes. By adulthood, affected individuals often have increasing difficulties with balance and walking unaided. Other problems that may appear in adolescence or early adulthood include lung damage due to repeated infections, impaired kidney function, and worsening vision due to the shrinking size (atrophy) of optic nerves, which carry information from the eyes to the brain.

Type 3, familial dysautonomia (FD) or Riley-Day syndrome, is an autosomal recessive disorder seen predominantly in Jews of eastern European descent. Patients present with sensory and autonomic disturbances. Newborns have absent or weak suck reflex, hypotonia and hypothermia. Delayed physical development, poor temperature and motor incoordination are seen in early childhood. Other features include reduced or absent tears, depressed deep tendon reflexes, absent corneal reflex, postural hypotension and relative indifference to pain. Scoliosis is frequent. Intelligence remains normal. Many patients die in infancy and childhood. Lack of flare with intradermal histamine is seen. Histopathology of peripheral nerve shows reduced number of myelinated and non-myelinated axons. The catecholamine endings are absent.

==== Genes related to Hereditary sensory and autonomic neuropathy Type 3 ====
Mutations in the IKBKAP gene cause familial dysautonomia. The IKBKAP gene provides instructions for making a protein called IKK complex-associated protein (IKAP). This protein is found in a variety of cells throughout the body, including brain cells.

Nearly all individuals with familial dysautonomia have two copies of the same IKBKAP gene mutation in each cell. This mutation can disrupt how information in the IKBKAP gene is pieced together to make a blueprint for the production of IKAP protein. As a result of this error, a reduced amount of normal IKAP protein is produced. This mutation behaves inconsistently, however. Some cells produce near normal amounts of the protein, and other cells—particularly brain cells—have very little of the protein. Critical activities in brain cells are probably disrupted by reduced amounts or the absence of IKAP protein, leading to the signs and symptoms of familial dysautonomia.

=== Type 4, Congenital insensitivity to pain with anhidrosis ===
Congenital insensitivity to pain with anhidrosis (CIPA), also known as hereditary sensory and autonomic neuropathy type IV (HSAN IV), is characterized by insensitivity to pain, anhidrosis (the inability to sweat), and intellectual disability. The ability to sense all pain (including visceral pain) is absent, resulting in repeated injuries including: oral self-mutilation (biting of tongue, lips, and buccal mucosa); biting of fingertips; bruising, scarring, and infection of the skin; multiple bone fractures (many of which fail to heal properly); and recurrent joint dislocations resulting in joint deformity. Sense of touch, vibration, and position are normal. Anhidrosis predisposes to recurrent febrile episodes that are often the initial manifestation of CIPA. Hypothermia in cold environments also occurs. Intellectual disability of varying degree is observed in most affected individuals; hyperactivity and emotional lability are common.

HSN4 is a rare genetic disorder characterized by the loss of sensation (sensory loss), especially in the feet and legs and, less severely, in the hands and forearms. The sensory loss is due to abnormal functioning of small, unmyelinated nerve fibers and portions of the spinal cord that control responses to pain and temperature as well as other involuntary or automatic body processes. Sweating is almost completely absent with this disorder. Intellectual disability is usually present.

Type 4, congenital insensitivity to pain with anhidrosis (CIPA), is an autosomal recessive condition and affected infants present with episodes of hyperthermia unrelated to environmental temperature, anhidrosis and insensitivity to pain. Palmar skin is thickened and charcot joints are commonly present. NCV shows motor and sensory nerve action potentials to be normal. The histopathology of peripheral nerve biopsy reveals absent small unmyelinated fibers and mitochondria are abnormally enlarged.

=== Type 5, Congenital insensitivity to pain with partial anhidrosis ===
Hereditary sensory and autonomic neuropathy type V (HSAN5) is a condition that primarily affects the sensory nerve cells. These cells are impaired in people with HSAN5.

The signs and symptoms of HSAN5 appear early, usually at birth or during infancy. People with HSAN5 lose the ability to feel pain, heat, and cold. Deep pain perception, the feeling of pain from injuries to bones, ligaments, or muscles, is especially affected in people with HSAN5. Because of the inability to feel deep pain, affected individuals suffer repeated severe injuries such as bone fractures and joint injuries that go unnoticed. Repeated trauma can lead to a condition called Charcot joints, in which the bones and tissue surrounding joints are destroyed.

Type 5, congenital insensitivity to pain with partial anhidrosis, also manifests with congenital insensitivity to pain & anhidrosis. There is a selective absence of small myelinated fibers differentiating it from Type IV (CIPA).

==== Genes related to Hereditary sensory and autonomic neuropathy Type 5 ====
Mutations in the NGF gene cause HSAN5. The NGF gene provides instructions for making a protein called nerve growth factor beta (NGFβ) that is important in the development and survival of nerve cells (neurons), including sensory neurons. The NGFβ protein functions by attaching (binding) to its receptors, which are found on the surface of neurons. Binding of the NGFβ protein to its receptor transmits signals to the cell to grow and to mature and take on specialized functions (differentiate). This binding also blocks signals in the cell that initiate the process of self-destruction (apoptosis). Additionally, NGFβ signaling plays a role in pain sensation. Mutation of the NGF gene leads to the production of a protein that cannot bind to the receptor and does not transmit signals properly. Without the proper signaling, sensory neurons die and pain sensation is altered, resulting in the inability of people with HSAN5 to feel pain.

=== Type 6, Familial dysautonomia with contractures ===
Hereditary sensory and autonomic neuropathy type 6 (HSAN6), also known as familial dysautonomia with contractures, is a severe autosomal recessive disorder characterized by neonatal hypotonia, respiratory and feeding difficulties, lack of psychomotor development, and autonomic abnormalities including labile cardiovascular function, lack of corneal reflexes leading to corneal scarring, areflexia, and absent axonal flare response after intradermal histamine injection.

==== Genes related to Hereditary sensory and autonomic neuropathy Type 6 ====
Mutations in the DST (Dystosin) gene are associated HSAN6. In two separate studies of families with presentations of HSAN6, the DST gene was found to be mutated, in one case with a truncating mutation, and in the other a non-sense or missense mutation. In the latter case, the authors proposed that homozygous truncating mutations result in a severe form of HSAN6, with congenital defects and early lethality, while heterozygosity for a truncating or missense mutation maintains enough dystosin expression and function to allow a normal lifespan, albeit with symptoms of HSAN6.

DST is involved in maintaining cytoskeleton integrity and intracellular transport systems, each of which are critical to the normal function of the particularly long neurons found in the peripheral nervous system. It's believed that this disrupts the cell's internal autophagy process, in which toxic proteins and other normally-occurring debris are captured and transported to the cell center for recycling or destruction. In neurons, autophagosomes, are generated at the ends of the neuron to carry the discardable material, and they are then transported toward center. With the intracellular transport system disrupted by a mutation in DST, the autophagosomes are unable to carry away the debris, which builds up at the ends of the neuron, leading to damage.

=== Type 7 ===
Hereditary sensory and autonomic neuropathy type 7 (HSAN7) is an autosomal dominant genetic condition caused by a mutation in the gene SCN11A with symptoms typically appearing at birth or during infancy. The disorder is characterized by a congenital inability to feel pain, excessive sweating, and significant gastrointestinal issues due to intestinal dysmotility. This pain insensitivity can lead to repeated, severe, and unnoticed injuries, while poor wound healing and hyperhidrosis are additional common features.

=== Type 8 ===
Hereditary sensory and autonomic neuropathy type 8 (HSAN8) is an autosomal recessive genetic disorder caused by a mutation in the gene PRDM12, with signs and symptoms usually appearing at birth or during infancy. Subject with this condition have a complete inability to feel pain and temperature, leading to severe, often unnoticed injuries and self-mutilation. Other symptoms include decreased sweating (anhidrosis) and absent corneal reflexes, which can result in overheating and severe eye injuries.

== Genetics ==
=== Associated genes ===
Type	Sub-type	Gene	Locus
HSAN 1	1A	SPTLC1	9q22.1-q22.3
HSAN 1	1B (CANVAS)	RFC1	4p14
HSAN 1	1C (= CMT2B, HMSN IIB)	RAB7A	3q21
HSAN 1	1D	ATL1	14q22.1
HSAN 1	1E	DNMT1 (OMIM 614116)	19p13.2
HSAN 2		HSN2	12p13.33
HSAN 3 (Familial dysautonomia)		IKBKAP	9q31
HSAN 4 (CIPA)		NTRK1	1q23.1
HSAN 4 (CIPA)		TRKA	1q23.1
HSAN 5		NGFβ	1p13.1
HSAN 5		NTRK1	1q23.1
HSAN 6		DST	6p12.1
HSAN 7		SCN11A	3p22.2
HSAN 8		PRDM12	9q33.2-34.13
