= SPTLC1 =

Protein-coding gene in the species Homo sapiens

Identifiers
- Aliases: SPTLC1, HSAN1, HSN1, LBC1, LCB1, SPT1, SPTI, serine palmitoyltransferase long chain base subunit 1
- External IDs: OMIM: 605712; MGI: 1099431; HomoloGene: 4681; GeneCards: SPTLC1; OMA:SPTLC1 - orthologs

Gene location (Human)
| Chr. | Chromosome 9 (human) |
| Band | 9q22.31 | Start | 92,000,087 bp |
| Band | 9q22.31 | End | 92,115,413 bp |

Gene location (Mouse)
| Chr. | Chromosome 13 (mouse) |
| Band | 13|13 B1 | Start | 53,486,784 bp |
| Band | 13|13 B1 | End | 53,531,433 bp |
RNA expression pattern
| Bgee | Human / Mouse (ortholog); Top expressed in: oral cavity; skin of hip; mucosa of sigmoid colon; Achilles tendon; skin of thigh; germinal epithelium; Epithelium of choroid plexus; mucosa of pharynx; vulva; mucosa of paranasal sinus / Top expressed in: gastrula; decidua; submandibular gland; retinal pigment epithelium; transitional epithelium of urinary bladder; saccule; ciliary body; iris; parotid gland; secondary oocyte; More reference expression data |
| BioGPS | n/a |
Gene ontology
| Molecular function | serine C-palmitoyltransferase activity; acyltransferase activity; protein binding; pyridoxal phosphate binding; catalytic activity; transferase activity |
| Cellular component | integral component of membrane; membrane; SPOTS complex; serine C-palmitoyltransferase complex; endoplasmic reticulum membrane; endoplasmic reticulum |
| Biological process | sphingolipid metabolic process; sphinganine biosynthetic process; sphingosine biosynthetic process; sphingomyelin biosynthetic process; positive regulation of lipophagy; lipid metabolism; sphingolipid biosynthetic process; biosynthesis; ceramide biosynthetic process; regulation of fat cell apoptotic process |
Sources:Amigo / QuickGO
Orthologs
| Species | Human | Mouse |
| Entrez | 10558 | 268656 |
| Ensembl | ENSG00000090054 | ENSMUSG00000021468 |
| UniProt | O15269 | O35704 |
| RefSeq (mRNA) | NM_001281303; NM_006415; NM_178324; NM_001368272; NM_001368273 | NM_009269 |
| RefSeq (protein) | NP_001268232; NP_006406; NP_847894; NP_001355201; NP_001355202 | NP_033295 |
| Location (UCSC) | Chr 9: 92 – 92.12 Mb | Chr 13: 53.49 – 53.53 Mb |
| PubMed search |
- Wikidata
| View/Edit Human | View/Edit Mouse |

Serine palmitoyltransferase, long chain base subunit 1, also known as SPTLC1, is a protein which in humans is encoded by the SPTLC1 gene.

Serine palmitoyltransferase, which consists of two different subunits, is the initial enzyme in sphingolipid biosynthesis. It converts L-serine and palmitoyl CoA to 3-oxosphinganine with pyridoxal 5'-phosphate as a cofactor. The product of this gene is the long chain base subunit 1 of serine palmitoyltransferase. Mutations in this gene were identified in patients with hereditary sensory neuropathy type 1, macular disease, and juvenile amyotrophic lateral sclerosis. Alternatively spliced variants encoding different isoforms have been identified.
