= HEXA =

Protein-coding gene in the species Homo sapiens

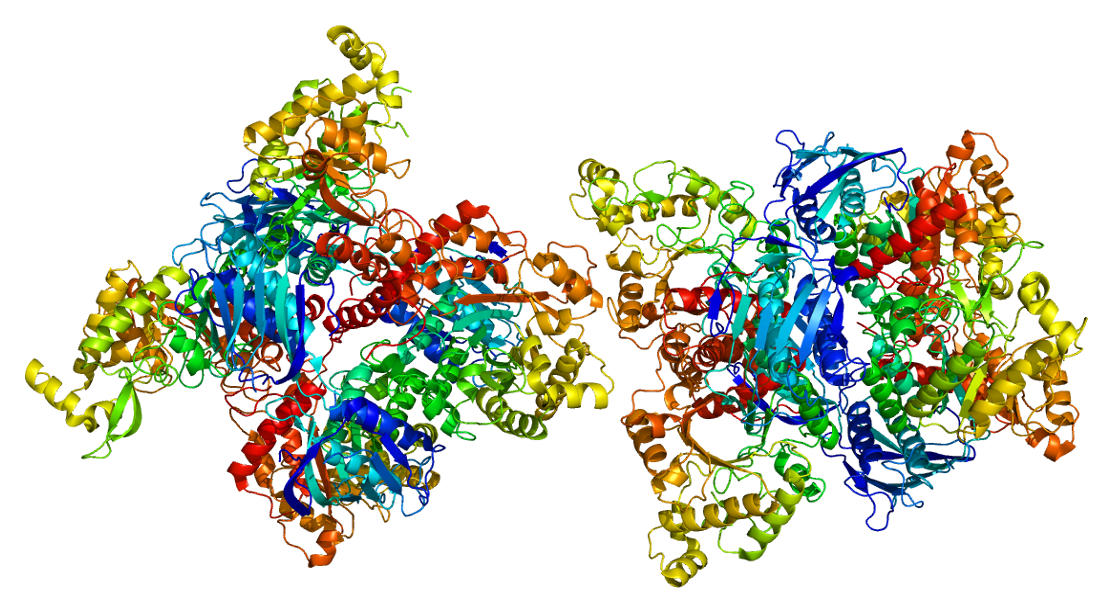

Identifiers
- Aliases: HEXA, TSD, hexosaminidase subunit alpha
- External IDs: OMIM: 606869; MGI: 96073; GeneCards: HEXA
Available structures
PDB	Ortholog search: PDBe RCSB
PDB	List of PDB id codes 2GJX, 2GK1
Enzyme activity
EC #	BRENDA	ExPASy	KEGG	MetaCyc
3.2.1.52	↗	↗	↗	↗

Gene location (Human)
Chr.	Chromosome 15 (human)
Band	15q23	Start	72,340,924 bp
Band	15q23	End	72,376,420 bp

Gene location (Mouse)
Chr.	Chromosome 9 (mouse)
Band	9 B|9 32.02 cM	Start	59,446,823 bp
Band	9 B|9 32.02 cM	End	59,472,392 bp
RNA expression pattern
Bgee	Human / Mouse (ortholog); Top expressed in: beta cell; gallbladder; stromal cell of endometrium; right adrenal cortex; left lobe of thyroid gland; right coronary artery; granulocyte; right lobe of thyroid gland; left adrenal gland; tendon of biceps brachii / Top expressed in: stroma of bone marrow; calvaria; decidua; body of femur; vestibular membrane of cochlear duct; mesenteric lymph nodes; iris; aortic valve; crypt of lieberkuhn of small intestine; ascending aorta; More reference expression data
BioGPS	n/a
Gene ontology
Molecular function	acetylglucosaminyltransferase activity; protein heterodimerization activity; hydrolase activity, hydrolyzing O-glycosyl compounds; hydrolase activity; hydrolase activity, acting on glycosyl bonds; beta-N-acetylhexosaminidase activity; N-acetyl-beta-D-galactosaminidase activity; protein binding
Cellular component	extracellular exosome; membrane; lysosome; lysosomal lumen; azurophil granule
Biological process	hyaluronan catabolic process; glycosaminoglycan biosynthetic process; metabolism; glycosphingolipid metabolic process; chondroitin sulfate catabolic process; keratan sulfate catabolic process; carbohydrate metabolic process
Sources:Amigo / QuickGO
Orthologs
Databases	NCBI: entry; OMA: entry
Species	Human	Mouse
Entrez	3073	15211
Ensembl	ENSG00000213614	ENSMUSG00000025232
UniProt	P06865	P29416
RefSeq (mRNA)	NM_000520; NM_001318825	NM_010421
RefSeq (protein)	NP_000511; NP_001305754	NP_034551
Location (UCSC)	Chr 15: 72.34 – 72.38 Mb	Chr 9: 59.45 – 59.47 Mb
PubMed search
- Wikidata
View/Edit Human	View/Edit Mouse

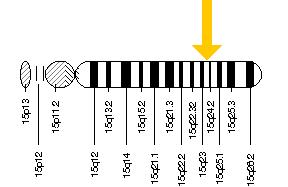
HEXA gene is located on the long (q) arm of chromosome 15 at position 24.1.

Hexosaminidase A (alpha polypeptide), also known as HEXA, is an enzyme that in humans is encoded by the HEXA gene, located on the 15th chromosome.

Hexosaminidase A and the cofactor G_{M2} activator protein catalyze the degradation of the G_{M2} gangliosides and other molecules containing terminal N-acetyl hexosamines. Hexosaminidase A is a heterodimer composed of an alpha subunit (this protein) and a beta subunit. The alpha subunit polypeptide is encoded by the HEXA gene while the beta subunit is encoded by the HEXB gene. Gene mutations in the gene encoding the beta subunit (HEXB) often result in Sandhoff disease; whereas, mutations in the gene encoding the alpha subunit (HEXA, this gene) decrease the hydrolysis of G_{M2} gangliosides, which is the main cause of Tay–Sachs disease.

== Function ==
Even though the alpha and beta subunits of hexosaminidase A can both cleave GalNAc residues, only the alpha subunit is able to hydrolyze G_{M2} gangliosides. The alpha subunit contains a key residue, Arg-424, which is essential for binding the N-acetyl-neuraminic residue of G_{M2} gangliosides. The alpha subunit can hydrolyze G_{M2} gangliosides because it contains a loop structure consisting of the amino acids: Gly-280, Ser-281, Glu-282, and Pro-283. The loop is absent in the beta subunit, but it serves as an ideal structure for the binding of the G_{M2} activator protein (G_{M2}AP) in the alpha subunit. A combination of Arg-424 and the amino acids that cause the formation of the loop allow the alpha subunit to hydrolyze G_{M2} gangliosides into G_{M3} gangliosides by removing the N-acetylgalactosamine (GalNAc) residue from G_{M2} gangliosides.

== Gene mutations resulting in Tay–Sachs disease ==
There are numerous mutations that lead to hexosaminidase A deficiency including gene deletions, nonsense mutations, and missense mutations. Tay–Sachs disease occurs when hexosaminidase A loses its ability to function. People with Tay–Sachs disease are unable to remove the GalNAc residue from the G_{M2} ganglioside, and as a result, they end up storing 100 to 1000 times more G_{M2} gangliosides in the brain than the normal person. Over 100 different mutations have been discovered just in infantile cases of Tay–Sachs disease alone.

The most common mutation, which occurs in over 80 percent of Tay–Sachs patients, results from a four base pair addition (TATC) in exon 11 of the Hex A gene. This insertion leads to an early stop codon, which causes the Hex A deficiency.

Children born with Tay–Sachs usually die between two and six years of age from aspiration and pneumonia. Tay–Sachs causes cerebral degeneration and blindness. Patients also experience flaccid extremities and seizures. There is no cure for Tay–Sachs disease.

== Gene therapies for Tay-Sachs ==
The HEXA gene is a protein encoding gene that codes for the lysosomal enzyme beta-hexosaminidase. This enzyme, combined with the GM2 activator protein, is responsible for the breakdown of ganglioside GM2 within the lysosome. Defects in the HEXA gene, however, prevent this degradation, leading to a buildup of toxins in brain and spinal cord cells. This fatal genetic disorder is called Tay-Sachs disease. Because the Tay-Sachs gene defect mainly affects neural cells, a patient with the HEXA mutation will experience a quick deterioration of motor and mental function before dying around the age of three or four.

A knockout model, which is a mouse that has been genetically modified to observe the effects of inactivation of or damage to certain genes, found that the mice that were administered the HEXA gene experienced many of the same symptoms of Tay-Sachs, with one exception: GM2 buildup was distributed differently in the brains of the mice than in those of a typical human Tay-Sachs patient. This model has allowed scientists to research gene therapies for HEXA defects. One study, done on mice, successfully reestablished beta-hexoaminidase levels and removed the toxic cell buildup by using a non-replicated Herpes simplex vector to code for the missing gene.
