= Warsaw breakage syndrome =

- Other names: WABS

Warsaw breakage syndrome (Warsaw syndrome, WABS) is a rare genetic condition. As of 2026, 26 cases have been documented in the medical literature. Its clinical manifestations affect several organ systems, and include microcephaly and severe growth retardation, among others.

== Signs and symptoms ==
The signs and symptoms of Warsaw breakage syndrome include:

- Severe pre- and postnatal growth retardation
- Microcephaly
- Intellectual disability
- Dysmorphic features
  - Small and elongated face
  - Narrow bifrontal diameter
  - Prominent cheeks
  - Small nares
  - Flat philtrum
  - Relatively large mouth
  - Bilateral epicanthal folds
  - High-arched palate
  - Microretrognathism
  - Coloboma of the optic disc
  - Strabismus
  - Cup-shaped ears
  - Sensorineural deafness
  - Short neck
  - Jugular hypoplasia
- Cardiac features
  - Ventricular septal defect
  - Tetralogy of Fallot
- Sketelal features
  - Clinodactyly of the fifth fingers
  - Syndactyly of the second and third toes
  - Small thumbs
  - Small fibulae
- Others
  - Abnormal skin pigmentation
  - Single palmar crease

The Israeli Health Ministry describes the condition manifestation as "characterized by smaller than average head circumference (microcephaly) as early as the embryonic stage, intrauterine growth restriction (IUGR) as well as postnatal growth restriction (dwarfism). Furthermore, patients born with this condition experience hearing impairments, moderate to significant developmental delays, skeletal disorders, and heart disorders (40%), as well as disorders of various body systems such as the renal and urogenital systems. In some patients, blood tests indicate increased chromosome fragility. Some fetuses die in utero (intrauterine fetal demise)."

== Genetics ==
This condition is caused by mutations in the DDX11 gene.

DDX11 mutation that causes WABS is described at US National Library of Medicine:

The DDX11 gene provides instructions for making an enzyme called ChlR1. This enzyme functions as a helicase. Helicases are enzymes that attach (bind) to DNA and temporarily unwind the two spiral strands (double helix) of the DNA molecule. This unwinding is necessary for copying (replicating) DNA in preparation for cell division, and for repairing damaged DNA and any errors that are made when DNA is copied. In addition, after DNA is copied, ChlR1 plays a role in ensuring proper separation of each chromosome during cell division. By helping repair errors in DNA and ensuring proper DNA replication, the ChlR1 enzyme is involved in maintaining the stability of a cell's genetic information. DDX11 gene mutations severely reduce or completely eliminate ChlR1 enzyme activity. As a result, the enzyme cannot bind to DNA and cannot unwind the DNA strands to help with DNA replication and repair. A lack of functional ChlR1 impairs cell division and leads to an accumulation of DNA damage. This DNA damage can appear as breaks in the DNA, giving the condition its name. It is unclear how these problems in DNA maintenance lead to the specific abnormalities characteristic of Warsaw breakage syndrome.

This gene encodes an iron-sulfur containing DNA helicase that belongs to the Fe–S DNA helicases. This protein interacts with the 9-1-1 checkpoint complex protein.

The inheritance pattern is autosomal recessive. A 2019 study estimated carrier frequency in the Ashkenazi Jewish population to be 1.47%, or 1 in 68. It was hypothesized that homozygosity for the pathogenic mutation results in a high rate of spontaneous abortion, explaining the discrepancy between the carrier frequency and documented cases of WABS.

=== Differential diagnosis ===
The DDX should be based on the following:

- Bloom syndrome
- Cornelia de Lange syndrome
- Fanconi anemia
- Nijmegen breakage syndrome
- Roberts syndrome
- Xeroderma pigmentosum

== Treatment ==
There is no known curative treatment for this condition presently. Management is supportive.

== History ==
This condition was first described in 2010.
