= IKBKAP =

Human gene encoding the IKAP protein

Inhibitor of κ light polypeptide gene enhancer in B-cells, kinase complex-associated protein

Identifiers
- Symbol: IKBKAP
- Alt. symbols: FD, DYS, ELP1, IKAP, IKI3, TOT1, FLJ12497 and DKFZp781H1425
- NCBI gene: 8518
- HGNC: 5959
- OMIM: 603722
- RefSeq: NM_003640
- UniProt: O95163

Other data
- Locus: Chr. 9 q13
Search for
- Structures: Swiss-model
- Domains: InterPro

IKBKAP (inhibitor of kappa light polypeptide gene enhancer in B-cells, kinase complex-associated protein) is a human gene encoding the IKAP protein, which is ubiquitously expressed at varying levels in all tissue types, including brain cells. The IKAP protein is thought to participate as a sub-unit in the assembly of a six-protein putative human holo-Elongator complex, which allows for transcriptional elongation by RNA polymerase II. Further evidence has implicated the IKAP protein as being critical in neuronal development, and directs that decreased expression of IKAP in certain cell types is the molecular basis for the severe, neurodevelopmental disorder familial dysautonomia. Other pathways that have been connected to IKAP protein function in a variety of organisms include tRNA modification, cell motility, and cytosolic stress signalling. Homologs of the IKBKAP gene have been identified in multiple other Eukaryotic model organisms. Notable homologs include Elp1 in yeast, Ikbkap in mice, and D-elp1 in fruit flies. The fruit fly homolog (D-elp1) has RNA-dependent RNA polymerase activity and is involved in RNA interference.

The IKBKAP gene is located on the long (q) arm of chromosome 9 at position 31, from base pair 108,709,355 to base pair 108,775,950.

== Function and mechanism ==
Originally, it was proposed that the IKBKAP gene in humans was encoding a scaffolding protein (IKAP) for the IκB enzyme kinase (IKK) complex, which is involved in pro-inflammatory cytokine signal transduction in the NF-κB signalling pathway. However, this was subsequently disproven when researchers applied a gel filtration method and could not identify IKK complexes contained in fractions with IKAP, thus dissociating IKAP from having a role in the NF-κB signalling pathway.

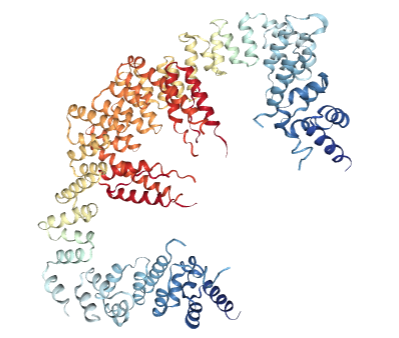
Dimerization of Elp1 is essential for Elongator complex assembly.

Later, it was discovered that IKAP functions as a cytoplasmic scaffold protein in the mammalian JNK-signalling pathway which is activated in response to stress stimuli. In an in vivo experiment, researchers showed direct interaction between IKAP and JNK induced by the application of stressors such as ultraviolet light and TNF-α (a pro-inflammatory cytokine).

IKAP is now also widely acknowledged to have a role in transcriptional elongation in humans. The RNA polymerase II holoenzyme constitutes partly of a multi-subunit histone acetyltransferase element known as the RNA polymerase II elongator complex, of which IKAP is one subunit. The association of the elongator complex with RNA polymerase II holoenzyme is necessary for subsequent binding to nascent pre-mRNA of certain target genes, and thus their successful transcription. Specifically, within the cell, the depletion of functional elongater complexes due to low IKAP expression has been found to have a profound effect on transcription of genes involved in cell migration.

In yeast, experimental data shows the elongator complex functioning in a variety of processes — from exocytosis to tRNA modification. This finding demonstrates that the function of the elongator complex is not conserved among species.

== Related conditions ==
=== Familial Dysautonomia ===
Familial dysautonomia (also known as “Riley-Day syndrome”) is a complex congenital neurodevelopmental disease, characterized by unusually low numbers of neurons in the sensory and autonomic nervous systems. The resulting symptoms of patients include gastrointestinal dysfunction, scoliosis, and pain insensitivity. This disease is especially prevalent in the Ashkenazi Jewish population, where 1/3600 live births present familial dysautonomia.

By 2001, the genetic cause of familial dysautonomia was localized to a dysfunctional region spanning 177kb on chromosome 9q31. With the use of blood samples from diagnosed patients, the implicated region was successfully sequenced. The IKBKAP gene, one of the five genes identified in that region, was found to have a single-base mutation in over 99.5% of cases of familial dysautonomia seen.

The single-base mutation, overwhelmingly noted as a transition from cytosine to thymine, is present in the 5’ splice donor site of intron 20 in the IKBKAP pre-mRNA. This prevents recruitment of splicing machinery, and thus exon 19 is spliced directly to exon 21 in the final mRNA product – exon 20 is removed from the pre-mRNA with the introns. The unintentional removal of an exon from the final mRNA product is termed exon skipping. Therefore, there is a decreased level of functional IKAP protein expression within affected tissue. However, this disorder is tissue-specific. Lymphoblasts, even with the mutation present, may continue to express some functional IKAP protein. In contrast, brain tissue with the single-base mutation in the IKBKAP gene predominantly express a resulting truncated, mutant IKAP protein which is nonfunctional. The exact mechanism for how the familial dysautonomia phenotype is induced due to reduced IKAP expression is unclear; still, as a protein involved in transcriptional regulation, there have been a variety of proposed mechanisms. One such theory suggests that critical genes in the development of wild-type sensory and autonomic neurons are improperly transcribed. An extension of this research suggests that genes involved in cell migration are impaired in the nervous system, creating a foundation for this disorder.

In a small number of reported familial dysautonomia cases, researchers have identified other mutations that cause a change in amino acids (the building blocks of proteins). In these cases, arginine is replaced by proline at position 696 in the IKAP protein's chain of amino acids (also written as Arg696Pro), or proline is replaced by leucine at position 914 (also written as Pro914Leu). Together, these mutations cause the resulting IKAP protein to malfunction.

As an autosomal recessive disorder, two mutated alleles of the IKBKAP gene are required for the disorder to manifest. However, despite the predominance of the same single-base mutation being the reputed cause of familial dysautonomia, the severity of the affected phenotype varies within and between families.

Kinetin (6-furfurylaminopurine) has been found to have the capacity to repair the splicing defect and increase wild-type IKBKAP mRNA expression in vivo. Further research is still required to assess the fitness of kinetin as a possible future oral treatment.

== See also ==
- Familial dysautonomia
