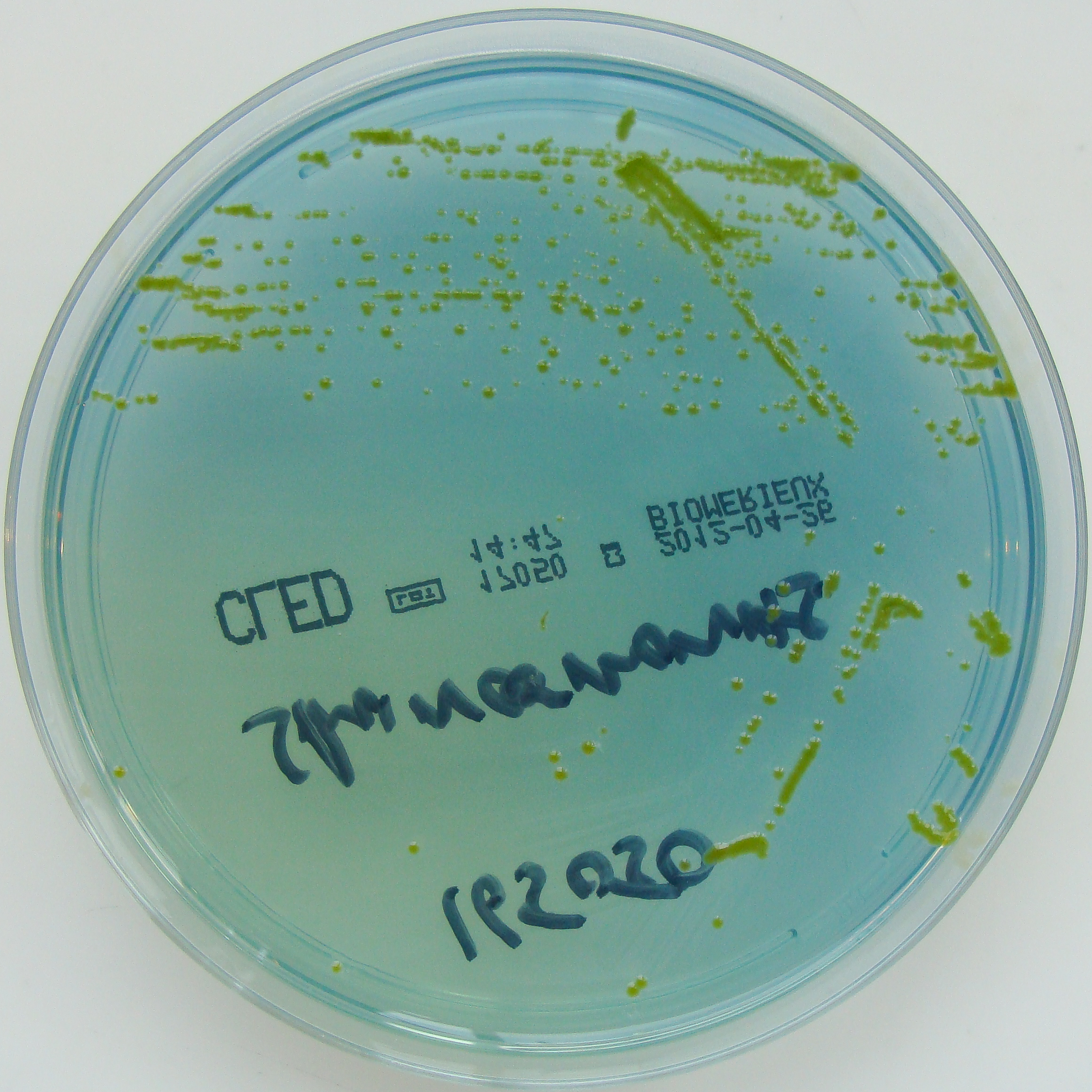
- Isolated from a blood culture from a leukaemic patient with pyrexia

Scientific classification
- Domain: Bacteria
- Kingdom: Pseudomonadati
- Phylum: Pseudomonadota
- Class: Alphaproteobacteria
- Order: Sphingomonadales
- Family: Sphingomonadaceae
- Genus: Sphingomonas
- Species: S. paucimobilis

Binomial name
- Sphingomonas paucimobilis (Holmes et al. 1977); Yabuuchi et al. 1990

Synonyms
- Pseudomonas paucimobilis Holmes et al. 1977

= Sphingomonas paucimobilis =

Species of bacterium

Sphingomonas paucimobilis is a strictly aerobic Gram-negative bacterium that has a single polar flagellum with slow motility. The cell size is around 0.7 x 1.4 μm. It is usually found in soil. As with the other members of the genus, its biochemistry is remarkable in possession of ubiquinone 10 as its major respiratory quinone, and of glycosphingolipids instead of lipopolysaccharides in its cell envelope. It has been implicated in various types of clinical infections.

Sphingomonas paucimobilis is able to degrade lignin-related biphenyl chemical compounds.
