= RETREG3 =

Protein-coding gene in the species Homo sapiens

Identifiers
- Aliases: RETREG3, FAM134C, reticulophagy regulator family member 3
- External IDs: OMIM: 616498; MGI: 1915248; HomoloGene: 23585; GeneCards: RETREG3; OMA:RETREG3 - orthologs

Gene location (Human)
Chr.	Chromosome 17 (human)
Band	17q21.2	Start	42,579,513 bp
Band	17q21.2	End	42,610,623 bp

Gene location (Mouse)
Chr.	Chromosome 11 (mouse)
Band	11|11 D	Start	100,987,148 bp
Band	11|11 D	End	101,010,719 bp
RNA expression pattern
Bgee	Human / Mouse (ortholog); Top expressed in: parotid gland; epithelium of nasopharynx; gingival epithelium; nipple; periodontal fiber; nasal epithelium; pylorus; body of pancreas; granulocyte; tendon of biceps brachii / Top expressed in: lip; neural layer of retina; granulocyte; muscle of thigh; spermatid; lens; thymus; dentate gyrus of hippocampal formation granule cell; cerebellar cortex; esophagus; More reference expression data
BioGPS	n/a
Gene ontology
Molecular function	protein binding
Cellular component	membrane; integral component of membrane; protein-containing complex
Biological process	positive regulation of neuron projection development
Sources:Amigo / QuickGO
Orthologs
Species	Human	Mouse
Entrez	162427	67998
Ensembl	ENSG00000141699	ENSMUSG00000017802
UniProt	Q86VR2	Q9CQV4
RefSeq (mRNA)	NM_178126	NM_026501; NM_028933; NM_001361583
RefSeq (protein)	NP_835227	NP_080777; NP_083209; NP_001348512
Location (UCSC)	Chr 17: 42.58 – 42.61 Mb	Chr 11: 100.99 – 101.01 Mb
PubMed search
- Wikidata
View/Edit Human	View/Edit Mouse

Reticulophagy regulator 3 is a protein that in humans is encoded by the RETREG3 (reticulophagy regulator family member 3) gene.
