= Protalix BioTherapeutics =

Israeli pharmaceutical company

Protalix BioTherapeutics Inc.
- Company type: Public
- Traded as: AMEX: PLX; TASE: PLX
- Industry: Biotechnology
- Founded: 1993
- Founder: Yoseph Shaaltiel
- Headquarters: Karmiel, Israel
- Key people: Shlomo Yanai (Interim Chairman); Moshe Manor (CEO)
- Products: Elelyso
- Revenue: ▼$11.51 million (2013)
- Total assets: ▲$113.33 million (2013)
- Number of employees: 266 (2013)
- Website: protalix.com

Protalix BioTherapeutics is an Israeli pharmaceutical company that manufactures a plant-based enzyme, taliglucerase alfa, which has received U.S. Food and Drug Administration approval for the treatment of Gaucher disease.

== Corporate history ==
Protalix BioTherapeutics was established in 1993. It was founded by Yoseph Shaaltiel, who received his Ph.D. in Plant Biochemistry from the Weizmann Institute in Israel and served in the Biology Department of the Israel Defense Forces' Biological and Chemical Center. One of the earliest and largest investors in the company was Phillip Frost. Protalix has two Nobel Prize winners (Chemistry) in its Scientific Advisory Board, Roger Kornberg Ph.D and Prof. MD. Aaron Ciechanover.

In its early days Protalix operated out of a warehouse in the town of Qiryat Shemona in northern Israel. On July 19, 2005, Protalix Biotherapeutics announced the closing of a $5.3 million private placement of its series C preferred stock. Protalix entered into a partnership agreement with Teva Pharmaceutical Industries in 2006 for the development of two proteins and in 2009 signed a collaboration agreement with Pfizer for the development and commercialization of its taliglucerase alfa treatment. Also in 2009, Protalix reported that Frost & Sullivan presented the company with its 2009 European Orphan Diseases Market Product Innovation of the Year Award. In 2011 Protalix announced that the U.S. Food and Drug Administration had approved the company's manufacturing facility in Karmiel.

Protalix initially became a public company through a reverse merger process with Orthodontix, a company which was at the time traded "over the counter" on the NASDAQ. This merger was completed on December 31, 2006, and is notable as one of the largest reverse mergers executed, valuing the joint entity at almost $1 billion. It subsequently applied for a listing on the AMEX, and sold 10 million shares in a public offering.

== Products ==
Protalix has been using cultured plant cells to manufacture biopharmaceuticals. As of 2017, Protalix has one FDA approved product sold by Pfizer in the U.S. and currently developing four products:

- Taliglucerase alfa (Elelyso) – a recombinant glucocerebrosidase enzyme produced from transgenic carrot cell cultures. Known also as Elelyso, taliglucerase won approval from the U.S. Food and Drug Administration in May 2012 as an orphan drug for the treatment of Type 1 Gaucher's disease. Protalix has licensed global development and commercialization rights for Elelyso to Pfizer, except for Brazil, where Protalix retains full rights. Brazil has the third largest number of Gaucher patients identified worldwide, after the U.S. and Israel. The Brazilian National Health Surveillance Agency, known as ANVISA, granted regulatory approval for Elelyso (Uplyso) to treat adults with Gaucher disease in March 2013, and extended that approval to children in December 2016.
- Alidornase alfa (PRX-110) – proprietary plant cell-expressed recombinant form of human deoxyribonuclease I (DNase I), that Protalix has designed, through chemical modification, to be resistant to inhibition by actin. DNase I is part of current Cystic Fibrosis therapy, intended to reduce sputum viscosity that accumulates in the lungs of Cystic Fibrosis patients, which exposes patients to recurrent infections and compromises lung function. AIR DNase (alidornase alfa), developed to make mucus in the lungs of cystic fibrosis patients less sticky, showed remarkably good results in 2017.
- Pegunigalsidase alfa (PRX-102) – plant cell culture expressed and a chemically modified version of the recombinant alpha-Galactosidase-A protein. Protein sub-units are covalently bound via chemical cross-linking using PEG chains, resulting in a more active and stable molecule than the current available versions. Protalix is currently conducting Phase 3 clinical trial for PRX-102 for the treatment of Fabry Disease following a successful meeting with U.S. Food and Drug Administration. Protalix announced positive results from its clinical trial for PRX-102. Pegunigalsidase alfa is being developed to replace Fabrazyme and interim data shows potential superiority in efficacy.
- OPRX-106 – plant cell-expressed recombinant human tumor necrosis factor receptor II fused to an IgG1 Fc domain (TNFRII-Fc), in development for oral administration. If successful, OPRX-106 will be the first ever oral enzyme treatment as currently there are no other oral enzyme treatments available.
- PRX-105 – a recombinant human Acetylcholinesterase, produced from genetically modified cell line of tobacco cells (Nicotiana tabacum), which can be used as a counter-measure against nerve agents attack. PRX-105 completed exploratory Phase I clinical trials.

== See also ==
- List of companies of Israel
- TA BlueTech Index
- Velaglucerase alfa
