= List of recombinant proteins =

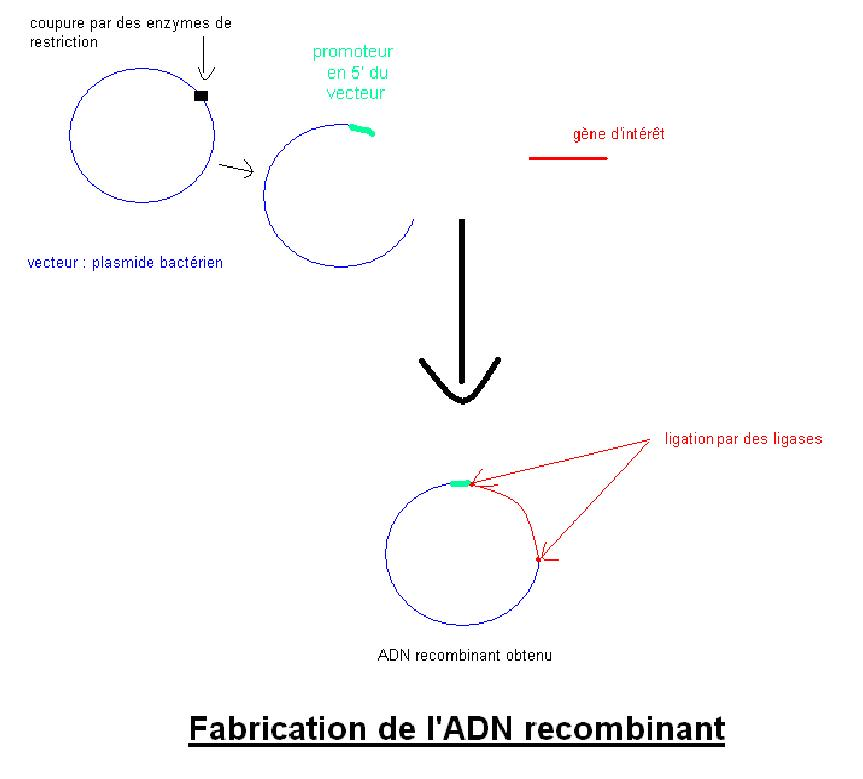
Manufacture of recombinant DNA

The following is a list of notable proteins that are produced from recombinant DNA, using biomolecular engineering. In many cases, recombinant human proteins have replaced the original animal-derived version used in medicine. The prefix "rh" for "recombinant human" appears less and less in the literature. A much larger number of recombinant proteins is used in the research laboratory. These include both commercially available proteins (for example most of the enzymes used in the molecular biology laboratory), and those that are generated in the course specific research projects.

== Human recombinants that largely replaced animal or harvested from human types ==
=== Medicinal applications ===
- Human growth hormone (rHGH): Humatrope from Lilly and Serostim from Serono replaced cadaver harvested human growth hormone
- human insulin (BHI): Humulin from Lilly and Novolin from Novo among others largely replaced bovine and porcine insulin for human therapy. Some prefer to continue using the animal-sourced preparations, as there is some evidence that synthetic insulin varieties are more likely to induce hypoglycemia unawareness. Remaining manufacturers of highly purified animal-sourced insulin include the U.K.'s Wockhardt Ltd. (headquartered in India), Argentina's Laboratorios Beta S.A., and China's Wanbang Biopharma Co.
- Follicle-stimulating hormone (FSH) as a recombinant gonadotropin preparation replaced Serono's Pergonal which was previously isolated from post-menopausal female urine
- Factor VIII: Kogenate from Bayer replaced blood harvested factor VIII

=== Research applications ===
- Ribosomal proteins: For the studies of individual ribosomal proteins, the use of proteins that are produced and purified from recombinant sources has largely replaced those that are obtained through isolation. However, isolation is still required for the studies of the whole ribosome.
- Lysosomal proteins: Lysosomal proteins are difficult to produce recombinantly due to the number and type of post-translational modifications that they have (e.g. glycosylation). As a result, recombinant lysosomal proteins are usually produced in mammalian cells. Plant cell culture was used to produce FDA-approved glycosylated lysosomal protein-drug, and additional drug candidates. Recent studies have shown that it may be possible to produce recombinant lysosomal proteins with microorganisms such as Escherichia coli and Saccharomyces cerevisiae. Recombinant lysosomal proteins are used for both research and medical applications, such as enzyme replacement therapy.

== Human recombinants with recombination as only source ==
=== Medicinal applications ===
- Erythropoietin (EPO): Epogen from Amgen
- Granulocyte colony-stimulating factor (G-CSF): filgrastim sold as Neupogen from Amgen; pegfilgrastim sold as Neulasta
- alpha-galactosidase A: Fabrazyme by Genzyme
- alpha-L-iduronidase: (rhIDU; laronidase) Aldurazyme by BioMarin Pharmaceutical and Genzyme
- N-acetylgalactosamine-4-sulfatase (rhASB; galsulfase): Naglazyme by BioMarin Pharmaceutical
- Dornase alfa, a DNase sold under the trade name Pulmozyme by Genentech
- Tissue plasminogen activator (TPA) Activase by Genentech
- Glucocerebrosidase: Ceredase by Genzyme
- Interferon (IF) Interferon-beta-1a: Avonex from Biogen Idec; Rebif from Serono; Interferon beta-1b as Betaseron from Schering. It is being investigated for the treatments of diseases including Guillain-Barré syndrome and multiple sclerosis.
- Insulin-like growth factor 1 (IGF-1)
- Rasburicase, a Urate Oxidase analog sold as Elitek from Sanofi

== Animal recombinants ==
=== Medicinal applications ===
- Bovine somatotropin (bST)
- Porcine somatotropin (pST)
- Bovine Chymosin

== Bacterial recombinants ==
=== Industrial applications ===
- Casein proteins, which are about 80% of the proteins in cow milk and between 20% and 60% in human milk.
- Xylanases, enzymes which degrade the linear polysaccharide xylan into xylose, thus breaking down hemicellulose, one of the major components of plant cell walls
- Proteases, an enzyme which catalyze proteolysis, breaking down proteins into smaller polypeptides or single amino acids. They have found applications in both the industrial (such as the food industry). and domestic settings.
- Whey proteins, which are about 20% of the proteins in cow milk and 60% in human milk.

== Viral recombinants ==
=== Medicinal applications ===
- Envelope protein of the hepatitis B virus marketed as Engerix-B by SmithKline Beecham
- HPV Vaccine proteins

== Plant recombinants ==
=== Research applications ===
- Polyphenol oxidases (PPOs): These include both catechol oxidases and tyrosinases. In additional to research, PPOs have also found applications as biocatalysts.
- Cystatins are proteins that inhibit cysteine proteases. Research are ongoing to evaluate the potential of using cystatins in crop protection to control herbivorous pests and pathogens.

=== Industrial applications ===
- Laccases have found a wide range of application, from food additive and beverage processing to biomedical diagnosis, and as cross‐linking agents for furniture construction or in the production of biofuels.
- The tyrosinase‐induced polymerization of peptides offers facile access to artificial mussel foot protein analogues. Next generation universal glues can be envisioned that perform effectively even under rigorous seawater conditions and adapt to a broad range of difficult surfaces.

== See also ==
- Protein production
- Gene expression
- Protein purification
- Host cell protein
