= New England Enzyme Center =

Biochemical resource center

The New England Enzyme Center (NEEC) was created at the Tufts University School of Medicine in Boston, Massachusetts in 1964 as a federally supported biochemical resource center.

== History ==
According to Doogab Yi, by the late 1970s NEEC had been transformed into "several commercial biotech companies."

Roscoe O. Brady and his colleagues at National Institutes of Health (NIH) were almost ready for a clinical trial for an enzyme replacement therapy for Gaucher's disease that they had been working on for over a decade. They could not purify the enzyme in large enough quantities.

"They contracted with Henry Blair, who had worked at NIH with Brady but left to form the New England Enzyme Center at Tufts University Medical School in Boston. Supported solely by contracts from Brady's lab, Blair set up a lab for large-scale purification and began collecting fresh placentas. In 1981, with NIH getting ready to move into larger clinical trials and biotechnology fever exploding around him, Blair privatized his venture. He launched Genzyme, with the NIH as its major source of revenue."

— Goozne 2005:44

Blair had started his career in the biotechnology industry working as a technician at Tufts medical school. In 1978 Henry E. Blair, from the NEEC and a team of researchers including Peter G. Pentchev, Roscoe O. Brady, Daniel E. Britton and Susan H. Sorrell from the National Institutes of Health co-authored a paper in the PNAS isolating and comparing enzymes in search of a treatment for Gaucher disease.

In 1981 venture capitalist Sheridan Snyder, Henry Blair and George M. Whitesides created the start-up Genzyme and continued to produce the enzymes for the NIH. Genzyme's first office was an old clothing warehouse adjacent to Tufts Medical School.
