= Glycoside hydrolase family 30 =

O-Glycosyl hydrolase family 30
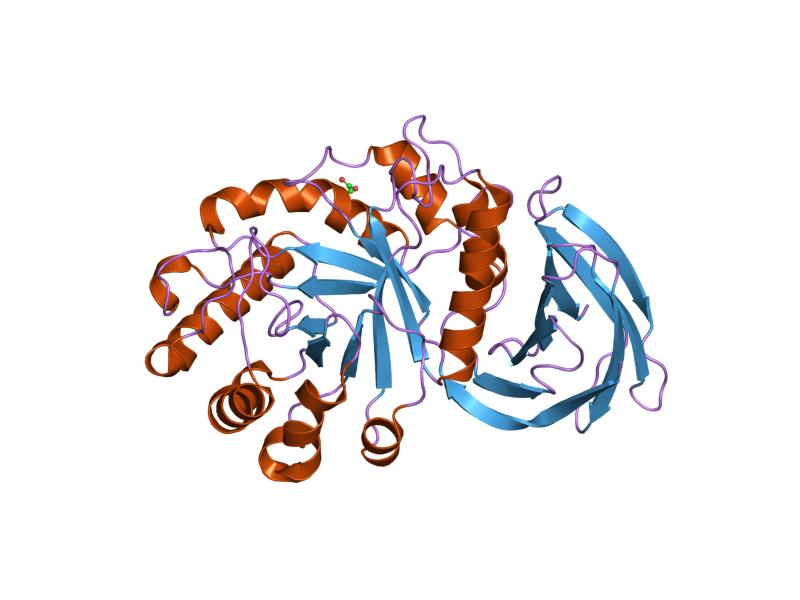
- Structure of a xylanase from glycoside hydrolase family 5.

Identifiers
- Symbol: Glyco_hydro_30
- Pfam: PF02055
- Pfam clan: CL0058
- InterPro: IPR001139
- SCOP2: 1nof / SCOPe / SUPFAM
- OPM superfamily: 117
- OPM protein: 1ogs
Available protein structures:
- PDB: IPR001139 PF02055 (ECOD; PDBsum)
- AlphaFold: IPR001139; PF02055

In molecular biology, glycoside hydrolase family 30 is a family of glycoside hydrolases.

Glycoside hydrolases EC 3.2.1. are a widespread group of enzymes that hydrolyse the glycosidic bond between two or more carbohydrates, or between a carbohydrate and a non-carbohydrate moiety. A classification system for glycoside hydrolases, based on sequence similarity, has led to the definition of >100 different families. This classification is available on the CAZy web site, and also discussed at CAZypedia, an online encyclopedia of carbohydrate active enzymes.

Glycoside hydrolase family 30 CAZY GH_30 includes the mammalian glucosylceramidases. Human acid beta-glucosidase (D-glucosyl-N-acylsphingosine glucohydrolase), cleaves the glucosidic bonds of glucosylceramide and synthetic beta-glucosides. Any one of over 50 different mutations in the gene of glucocerebrosidase have been found to affect activity of this hydrolase, producing variants of Gaucher disease, the most prevalent lysosomal storage disease.
