= C2532H3854N672O711S16 =

The molecular formula C_{2532}H_{3854}N_{672}O_{711}S_{16} (molar mass: 55597.4 g/mol) may refer to:

- Alglucerase
- Imiglucerase
