= Globoside alpha-N-acetylgalactosaminyltransferase =

Class of enzymes

globoside alpha-N-acetylgalactosaminyltransferase

Identifiers
- EC no.: 2.4.1.88
- CAS no.: 52037-97-5

Databases
- IntEnz: IntEnz view
- BRENDA: BRENDA entry
- ExPASy: NiceZyme view
- KEGG: KEGG entry
- MetaCyc: metabolic pathway
- PRIAM: profile
- PDB structures: RCSB PDB PDBe PDBsum
- Gene Ontology: AmiGO / QuickGO
Search
- PMC: articles
- PubMed: articles
- NCBI: proteins

In enzymology, a globoside alpha-N-acetylgalactosaminyltransferase (EC 2.4.1.88) is an enzyme that catalyzes the chemical reaction

UDP-N-acetyl-D-galactosamine + N-acetyl-D-galactosaminyl-1,3-D-galactosyl-1,4-D-galactosyl-1,4-D- glucosylceramide $\rightleftharpoons$ UDP + N-acetyl-D-galactosaminyl-N-acetyl-D-galactosaminyl-1,3-D- galactosyl-1,4-D-galactosyl-1,4-D-glucosylceramide

The 3 substrates of this enzyme are UDP-N-acetyl-D-galactosamine, N-acetyl-D-galactosaminyl-1,3-D-galactosyl-1,4-D-galactosyl-1,4-D-, and glucosylceramide, whereas its 3 products are UDP, N-acetyl-D-galactosaminyl-N-acetyl-D-galactosaminyl-1,3-D-, and galactosyl-1,4-D-galactosyl-1,4-D-glucosylceramide.

This enzyme belongs to the family of glycosyltransferases, specifically the hexosyltransferases. The systematic name of this enzyme class is UDP-N-acetyl-D-galactosamine:N-acetyl-D-galactosaminyl-1,3-D-galacto syl-1,4-D-galactosyl-1,4-D-glucosylceramide alpha-N-acetyl-D-galactosaminyltransferase. Other names in common use include uridine diphosphoacetylgalactosamine-globoside, alpha-acetylgalactosaminyltransferase, Forssman synthase, and globoside acetylgalactosaminyltransferase. This enzyme participates in glycosphingolipid biosynthesis - globoseries and glycan structures - biosynthesis 2.
