= Genzyme =

Biotechnology company

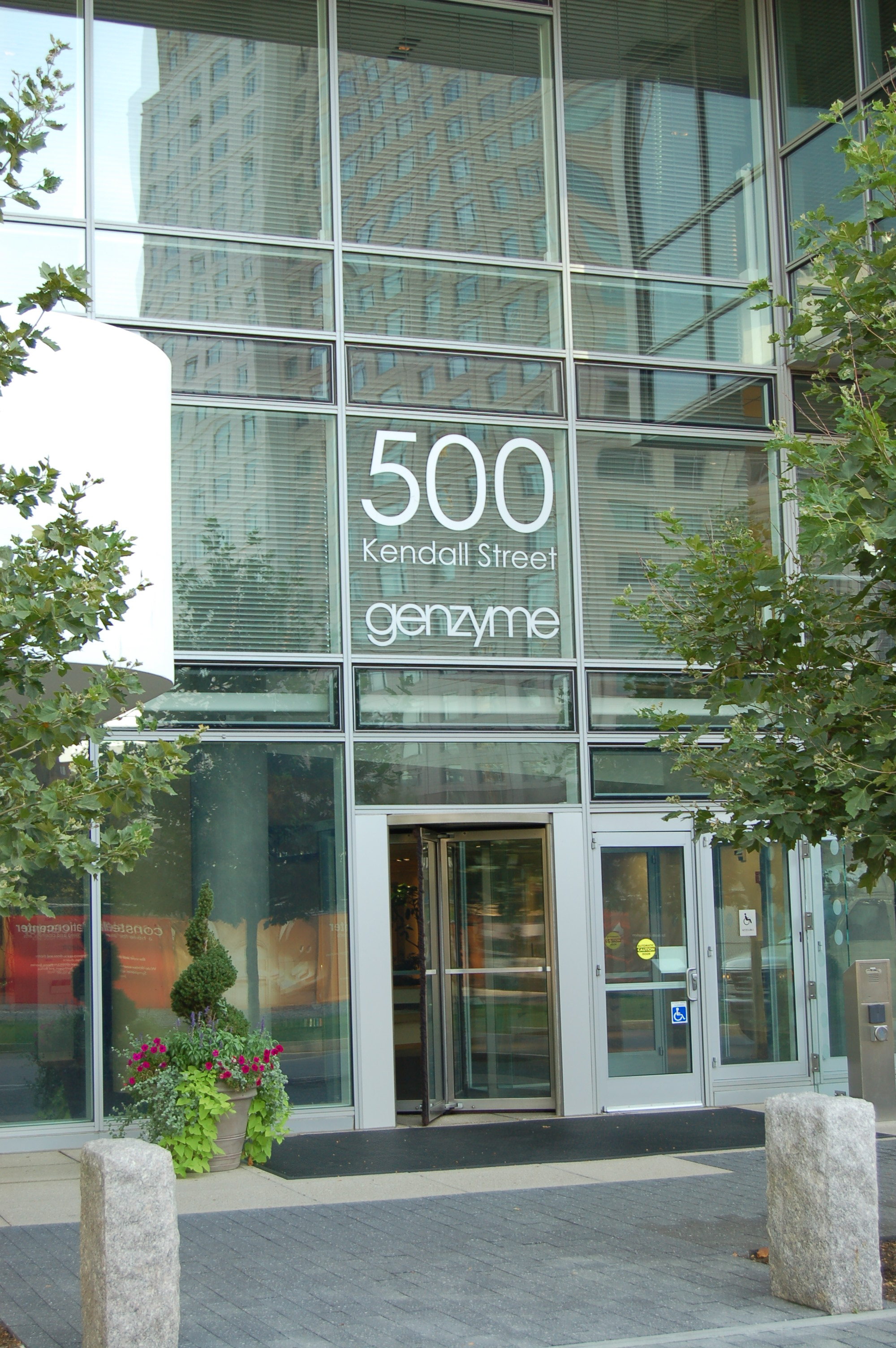
- Sanofi Genzyme headquarters in Cambridge, Massachusetts in 2007
- Type: Subsidiary
- Traded as: Nasdaq: GENZ
- Industry: Biotechnology
- Founded: 1981; 45 years ago, in Boston, Massachusetts
- Headquarters: Cambridge, Massachusetts, United States
- Key people: Bill Sibold; Paul Hudson
- Products: Cerezyme; Fabrazyme; Synvisc; Renagel; More Complete Product List
- Revenue: US $4.61 billion (2007 calendar)
- Operating income: ▲US $581 million (2007 calendar)
- Net income: ▲US $421 million (2007 calendar)
- Number of employees: 12,000 (2010)
- Parent: Sanofi
- Website: sanofigenzyme.com

Genzyme (also known as Genzyme Transgenics Corp or GTC Biotherapeutics) was an American biotechnology company based in Cambridge, Massachusetts. From its acquisition in 2011 to 2022 Genzyme operated as a fully owned subsidiary of Sanofi. In 2010, Genzyme was the world's third-largest biotechnology company, employing more than 11,000 people around the world. As a subsidiary of Sanofi, Genzyme had a presence in approximately 65 countries, including 17 manufacturing facilities and 9 genetic-testing laboratories. Its products were also sold in 90 countries. In 2007, Genzyme generated $3.8 billion in revenue with more than 25 products on the market. In 2006 and 2007, Genzyme was named one of Fortune magazine’s “100 Best Companies to Work for”. The company donated $83 million worth of products worldwide; in 2006, it made $11 million in cash donations. In 2005, Genzyme was awarded the National Medal of Technology, the highest level of honor awarded by the president of the United States to America's leading innovators. In February 2022, Sanofi's new corporate brand was unveiled and former entity "Sanofi Genzyme" was integrated into Sanofi.

== History ==
=== 1980s: Early history ===
The company was started by Sheridan Snyder and George M. Whitesides in 1981. Genzyme's scientific founder was Henry Blair who had a contract with the National Institutes of Health (NIH) to produce modified enzymes for the NIH to test in clinical trials. Blair was a technician at the New England Enzyme Center at Tufts Medical School. Genzyme's first office was an old clothing warehouse adjacent to Tufts Medical School. In 1981, with the help of venture capital funding, the company made its first acquisition; Whatman Biochemicals Ltd. In 1982, it made its second acquisition, British-based Koch-Light Laboratories, later becoming Genzyme Pharmaceutical and Fine Chemicals.

Henri Termeer joined Genzyme as its president in 1983 and worked to redirect the company, which by this time had reached a valuation of $100 million, from its focus on diagnostic enzymes to modified enzymes for use as human therapeutics.

In 1984, Robin Berman, MD, who volunteered at the NIH, had a three-year-old son Brian, who had Gaucher's disease. He was scheduled for a spleen removal but his mother pleaded with Roscoe Brady, MD, an expert in Gaucher's disease, to include Brian in the clinical trial of Ceredase along with the other seven patients who were all adults. This trial ultimately failed due to use of too low a dose of the enzyme, but Ceredase went on to "become the company's most important product line", receiving FDA approval in 1991

In 1985, Termeer became the company's Chief executive officer (CEO) and in 1986, he took the company public.

In 1989, Termeer acquired Integrated Genetics, strengthening the company's presence in molecular biology, protein chemistry, carbohydrate engineering, nucleic acid chemistry, and enzymology.

=== 1990s: Product launches and further expansion ===
Following the approval and success of Ceredase in 1991, Genzyme became devoted to finding drugs, involving recombinant human enzymes that would treat enzyme deficiency conditions that were essential to human survival and which usually afflict a very small percentage of the world's population. Drugs used to treat such conditions are considered to be orphan drugs. Ceredase was the first effective treatment for Gaucher's disease, a previously rare, untreatable and potentially fatal genetic disorder. At the time, Ceredase also drew criticism for being the most expensive drug ever sold, on average $150,000 per patient a year. In 1991, Genzyme also took IG laboratories, acquired in 1989, public raising $14 million on IPO. Genzyme's also sold off its interest in GENE-TRAK systems for $10 million and acquired Genecore International's diagnostic enzyme division.

In 1992, Genzyme acquired Medix Biotech, Inc., a producer and supplier of monoclonal and polyclonal antibodies, immunoassay components, and immunodiagnostic services. In the same year, Genzyme Limited, acquired Enzymatix Ltd and genetics testing laboratory Vivigen.

In 1993, the company acquired German distributor of invitro diagnostic kits, Virotech and immunobiological products manufacturer Omni Res srl.

In 1994, Genzyme received FDA approval to market Cerezyme, a genetically engineered replacement for Ceredase. The company acquired Sygena Ltd, BioSurface Technology Inc. and TSI Inc.. TSI was acquired by Genzyme Transgenics Corp. which was 73 percent owned by Genzyme.

In 1997, the company acquired PharmaGenics, Inc. creating Genzyme Molecular Oncology.

In 1999, Genzyme Surgical Products is established within the wider Group.

=== 2000s: diversification ===
In 2000, the company announced its plan to acquire Biomatrix, Inc.

In August 2003, the company acquired SangStat Medical Corp. and its principal anti-organ rejection drug named Thymoglobulin for $600 million.

In 2004, the company acquired Ilex Oncology Inc. Genzyme acquired several of Impath's laboratories and cancer-testing technologies in May 2004, after Impath sought Chapter 11 bankruptcy protection.

In 2005, the company acquired Bone Care International Inc for $600 million.

In 2006, the company acquired AnorMED Inc. for $580 million

In 2007, the company agreed to acquire Bioenvision for $345 million, motivated by the potential of the leukemia treatment clofarabine.

In 2010, the year before the company's acquisition by Sanofi-Aventis, Genzyme had more than $400 million on net income on revenue of $4 billion and was the fourth-largest American biopharmaceutical company. By this time, enzyme therapies accounted for about 40% of revenues, a portfolio managed by the "Personalized Genetic Health" unit, the largest of five operating units. In the same year the company sold Genzyme Genetics for $925 million to LabCorp.

In 2011, Sanofi acquired the company for $20.1 billion.

=== Acquisition history ===
The following is an illustration of the company's major mergers and acquisitions and historical predecessors (this is not a comprehensive list):

- Genzyme (Acquired by Sanofi in 2010)
  - - - - - - - - - - - - - - - - - - - - Genzyme
                                          (Founded 1981)
                                        - Whatman Biochemicals Ltd
                                          (Acq 1981)
                                      - Koch-Light Laboratories
                                        (Acq 1982)
                                    - Integrated Genetics
                                      (Acq 1989, IPO 1991)
                                  - Genecore International
                                    (Diagnostic enzyme div, Acq 1991)
                                - Medix Biotech, Inc.
                                  (Acq 1992)
                              - Enzymatix Ltd
                                (Acq 1992)
                            - Vivigen
                              (Acq 1992)
                          - Virotech
                            (Acq 1993)
                        - Omni Res srl
                          (Acq 1993)
                      - Sygena Ltd
                        (Acq 1994)
                    - BioSurface Technology Inc.
                      (Acq 1994)
                  - TSI Inc.
                    (Acq 1994)
                - PharmaGenics, Inc.
                  (Acq 1997)
              - Biomatrix
                (Acq 2000)
            - GelTex Pharmaceuticals
              (Acq 2000)
          - SangStat Medical Corp.
            (Acq 2003)
        - Ilex Oncology Inc.
          (Acq 2004)
      - Bone Care International Inc
        (Acq 2005)
    - AnorMED Inc.
      (Acq 2006)
  - Bioenvision
    (Acq 2007)

== Operations ==
Genzyme focuses on six areas of medicine relating to lysosomal storage diseases, renal disease, orthopedics, transplant and immune diseases, oncology, genetics, and diagnostics. The first orphan drug for Genzyme that the FDA approved was Ceredase, a drug for treating Gaucher disease. Ceredase was eventually replaced by Cerezyme, which, for $200,000 per patient annually for life, currently accounts for approximately 30% of Genzyme's revenue. Other important drugs made by Genzyme are Renagel, used in the treatment of dialysis patients, and Fabrazyme, used to treat patients with Fabry's disease. Other products in development are Tolevamer for Clostridioides difficile infection and Campath for Chronic lymphocytic leukemia.

Genzyme had a sub-license from Bioenvision to market clofarabine in North America. On May 29, 2007, Genzyme made a tender offer to purchase Bioenvision for $5.60 per share. On October 27, 2007, most shareholders voted to approve Genzyme's acquisition. In 2007, CEO, President, and Board Chairman Henri Termeer, earned a salary of $2.5 million, and non-cash compensation worth $129 million.

In 2010, Genzyme launched a kidney medication for the Irish market from its Waterford base which it had set up nine years previously.

Manufacturing Sites: Allston MA USA; Geel Belgium; Framingham, MA, USA; Haverhill, Suffolk UK; Waterford, Munster Ireland;

== Contamination incidents ==
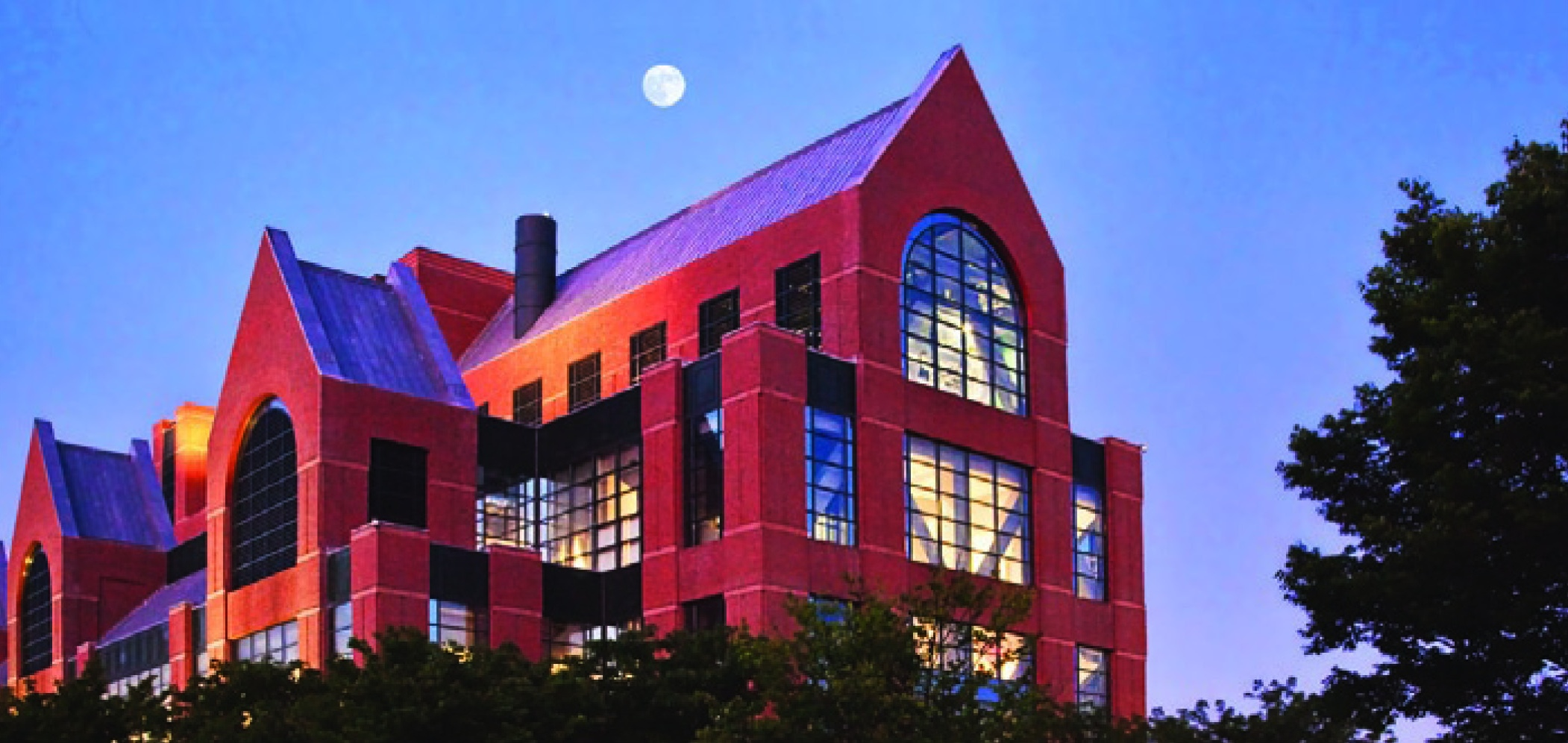
The troubled Genzyme plant in Allston, Massachusetts

In June 2009, Genzyme's Allston, Massachusetts plant was shut down to correct a viral contamination (Vesivirus 2117). A similar event had occurred in 2008 at the Geel, Belgium facilities. By April 2010, it had restarted operation at diminished capacity.

In November 2009, fragments of stainless steel, rubber, and fiber-like material were discovered in some of Genzyme's drugs. The FDA found these materials in Cerezyme, Genzyme's treatment for Gaucher disease, a rare genetic disorder that can lead to life-threatening organ damage. The FDA is permitting the drug to stay in the market, due to a lack of adverse events, and a critical need for the product.

Supplies of Fabrazyme, Genzyme's treatment for Fabry disease, have been rationed to one-third the recommended dose prompting patients to file a petition asking for a license to produce Fabrazyme by other manufacturers to make up the deficit under the Bayh–Dole Act.

== Products ==
- Aldurazyme
- Alprolix
- Aubagio
- Cablivi
- Cerdelga
- Cerezyme
- Clolar
- Dupixent
- Elitek
- Eloctate
- Eloxatin
- Fabrazyme
- Jevtana
- Kevzara
- Lemtrada
- Libtayo
- Lumizyme
- Sarclisa
- Taxotere
- Zaltrap

== Lobbying ==
Genzyme has spent more than $8.2 million on lobbying from 2007 to 2009. In 2009 alone, it had 10 different organizations with a total of 49 lobbyists working on its behalf.

== Takeover bid ==
On August 30, 2010, Sanofi announced a bid to acquire Genzyme for $18.5 billion. The deal was later rejected by the board of Genzyme. On February 16, 2011, Sanofi declared the full acquisition of Genzyme for $20.1 billion.

== Lawsuit over marketing of Seprafilm ==
In September 2015, Genzyme accepted responsibility and agreed to pay $32.59 million over U.S. charges against its marketing of the adhesion barrier product Seprafilm. Genzyme's sales representatives had been instructing surgeons on how to create a "slurry" using Seprafilm for use during laparoscopic surgeries. This use of Seprafilm is not FDA-approved.

Genzyme had also reached a $22.28 million civil agreement pertaining to marketing of Seprafilm in December 2013. Genzyme was claimed to be in violation of the federal False Claims Act.
