= GBA3 =

Protein-coding gene in the species Homo sapiens

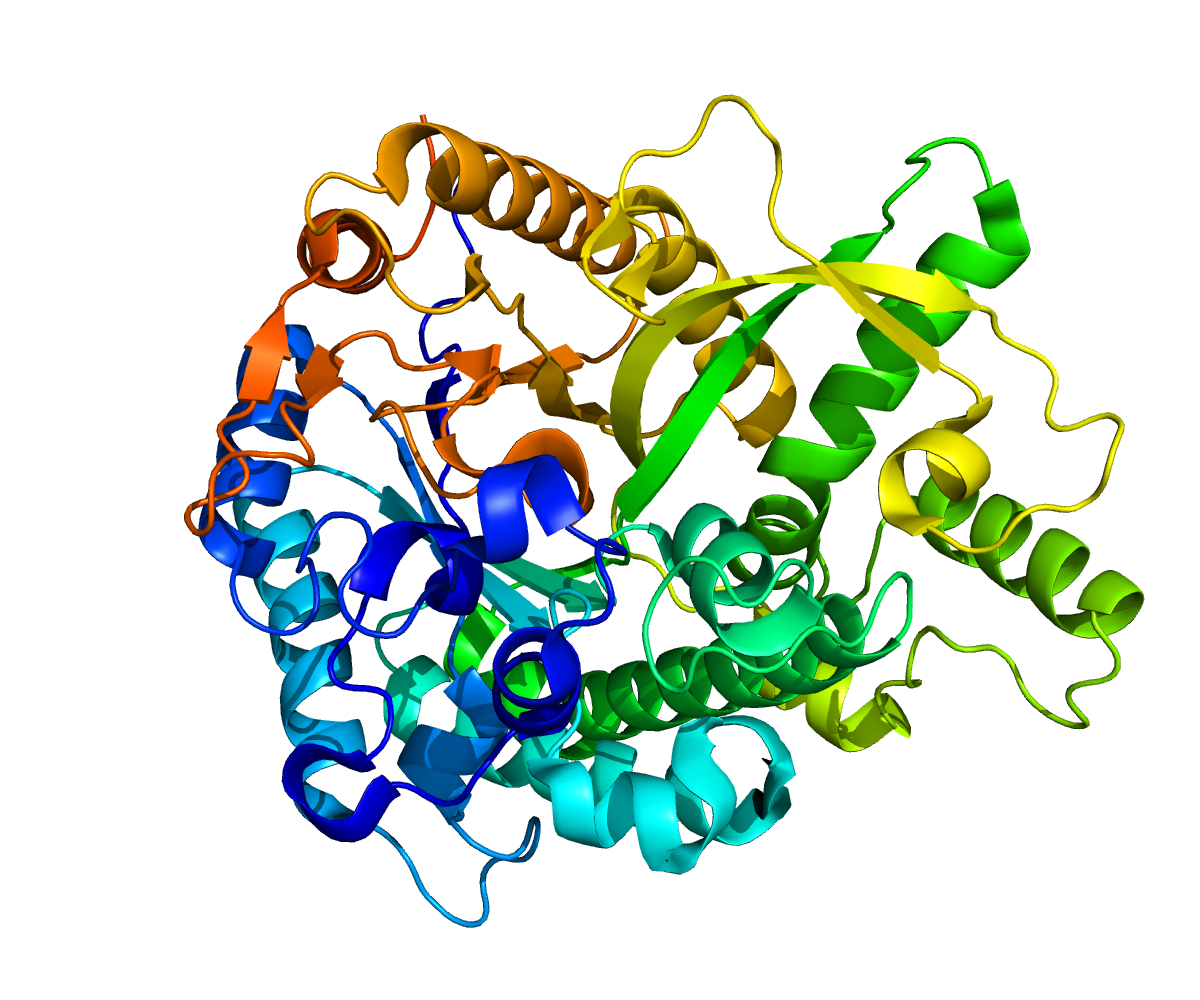

Identifiers
- Aliases: GBA3, CBG, CBGL1, GLUC, KLRP, glucosylceramidase beta 3 (gene/pseudogene)
- External IDs: OMIM: 606619; GeneCards: GBA3
Available structures
PDB	Human UniProt search: PDBe RCSB
PDB	List of PDB id codes 2E9L, 2E9M, 2JFE, 2ZOX, 3VKK
Enzyme activity
EC #	BRENDA	ExPASy	KEGG	MetaCyc
3.2.1.21	↗	↗	↗	↗
3.2.1.45	↗	↗	↗	↗
3.2.1.46	↗	↗	↗	↗

Gene location (Human)
Chr.	Chromosome 4 (human)
Band	4p15.2	Start	22,692,914 bp
Band	4p15.2	End	22,819,575 bp
RNA expression pattern
Bgee	Human / Mouse (ortholog); Top expressed in: jejunal mucosa; mucosa of ileum; duodenum; human kidney; liver; right lobe of liver; renal medulla; kidney tubule; buccal mucosa cell; testicle / n/a; More reference expression data
BioGPS	n/a
Gene ontology
Molecular function	beta-galactosidase activity; glycosylceramidase activity; hydrolase activity, hydrolyzing O-glycosyl compounds; beta-glucosidase activity; hydrolase activity; hydrolase activity, acting on glycosyl bonds; scopolin beta-glucosidase activity; glucosylceramidase activity; protein binding; galactosylceramidase activity
Cellular component	cytoplasm; cytosol; catalytic complex
Biological process	glycosylceramide catabolic process; metabolism; glycosphingolipid metabolic process; glycoside catabolic process; protein stabilization; cellular oligosaccharide catabolic process; positive regulation of exo-alpha-sialidase activity; carbohydrate metabolic process; glucosylceramide catabolic process; galactosylceramide catabolic process; beta-glucoside catabolic process
Sources:Amigo / QuickGO
Orthologs
Databases	NCBI: entry; OMA: entry
Species	Human	Mouse
Entrez	57733	n/a
Ensembl	ENSG00000249948	n/a
UniProt	Q9H227	n/a
RefSeq (mRNA)	NM_001128432; NM_001277225; NM_020973	n/a
RefSeq (protein)	NP_001121904; NP_001264154; NP_066024	n/a
Location (UCSC)	Chr 4: 22.69 – 22.82 Mb	n/a
PubMed search		n/a
- Wikidata
View/Edit Human

Cytosolic beta-glucosidase, also known as cytosolic beta-glucosidase-like protein 1, is a beta-glucosidase (EC 3.2.1.21) enzyme that in humans is encoded by the GBA3 gene.

== Function ==
Cytosolic beta-glucosidase is a predominantly liver enzyme that efficiently hydrolyzes beta-D-glucoside and beta-D-galactoside, but not any known physiologic beta-glycoside, suggesting that it may be involved in detoxification of plant glycosides. GBA3 also has significant neutral glycosylceramidase activity (EC 3.2.1.62), suggesting that it may be involved in a non-lysosomal catabolic pathway of glucosylceramide metabolism.

== See also ==
- Closely related enzymes
  - GBA: acid β-glucosidase, EC 3.2.1.45
  - GBA2: acid β-glucosidase (bile acid), also EC 3.2.1.45
