= Lactosylceramide 4-alpha-galactosyltransferase =

Protein family

lactosylceramide 4-alpha-galactosyltransferase

Identifiers
- EC no.: 2.4.1.228
- CAS no.: 52725-57-2

Databases
- IntEnz: IntEnz view
- BRENDA: BRENDA entry
- ExPASy: NiceZyme view
- KEGG: KEGG entry
- MetaCyc: metabolic pathway
- PRIAM: profile
- PDB structures: RCSB PDB PDBe PDBsum
- Gene Ontology: AmiGO / QuickGO
Search
- PMC: articles
- PubMed: articles
- NCBI: proteins

In enzymology, a lactosylceramide 4-alpha-galactosyltransferase (EC 2.4.1.228) is an enzyme that catalyzes the chemical reaction

UDP-galactose + beta-D-galactosyl-(1->4)-D-glucosylceramide $\rightleftharpoons$ UDP + alpha-D-galactosyl-(1->4)-beta-D-galactosyl-(1->4)-D- glucosylceramide

Thus, the two substrates of this enzyme are UDP-galactose and [[beta-D-galactosyl-(1->4)-D-glucosylceramide]], whereas its 3 products are UDP, [[alpha-D-galactosyl-(1->4)-beta-D-galactosyl-(1->4)-D-]], and glucosylceramide.

This enzyme belongs to the family of glycosyltransferases, specifically the hexosyltransferases. The systematic name of this enzyme class is UDP-galactose:lactosylceramide 4II-alpha-D-galactosyltransferase. Other names in common use include Galbeta1-4Glcbeta1-Cer alpha1,4-galactosyltransferase, globotriaosylceramide/CD77 synthase, and histo-blood group Pk UDP-galactose. This enzyme participates in glycosphingolipid biosynthesis - globoseries and glycan structures - biosynthesis 2.
