= Cipaglucosidase alfa =

Enzyme replacement therapy medication

Clinical data
- Trade names: Pombiliti
- Other names: ATB-200, ATB200, cipaglucosidase alfa-atga
- AHFS/Drugs.com: Monograph
- MedlinePlus: a623057
- License data: US DailyMed: Cipaglucosidase alfa
- Pregnancy category: Contraindicated
- Routes of administration: Intravenous
- Drug class: Enzyme replacement
- ATC code: A16AB23 (WHO)

Legal status
- Legal status: AU: S4 (Prescription only); CA: ℞-only / Schedule D; UK: Early access to medicines scheme; US: ℞-only; EU: Rx-only

Identifiers
- CAS Number: 2359727-71-0
- DrugBank: DB16708
- UNII: 4SED7F4BSG
- KEGG: D11798
- ChEMBL: ChEMBL4594329

Chemical and physical data
- Formula: C_{4489}H_{6817}N_{1197}O_{1298}S_{32}
- Molar mass: 99347.92 g·mol^{−1}

Cipaglucosidase alfa, sold under the brand name Pombiliti, and used in combination with miglustat, is a medication used for the treatment of glycogen storage disease type II (Pompe disease). Cipaglucosidase alfa is a recombinant human acid α-glucosidase enzyme replacement therapy that provides an exogenous source of acid α-glucosidase.

The most common side effects include chills, dizziness, flushing, sleepiness, chest discomfort, cough, swelling at the infusion site and pain. The most common side effects of cipaglucosidase alfa in combination with miglustat are headache, diarrhea, fatigue, nausea, abdominal pain, and fever.

Cipaglucosidase alfa was approved for medical use in the European Union in March 2023, and in the United States in September 2023.

== Medical uses ==
Cipaglucosidase alfa is a long-term enzyme replacement therapy used in combination with the enzyme stabilizer miglustat for the treatment of adults with late-onset Pompe disease (acid α-glucosidase [GAA] deficiency).

== Adverse effects ==
Cipaglucosidase alfa in combination with miglustat may cause serious side effects including life-threatening allergic reactions during and after the infusion and harm to an unborn baby if taken while pregnant.

The most common side effects of cipaglucosidase alfa in combination with miglustat are headache, diarrhea, fatigue, nausea, abdominal pain, and fever.

== History ==
The FDA approved cipaglucosidase alfa in combination with miglustat based on evidence from a clinical trial (Trial 1/NCT03729362) of 123 participants with late-onset Pompe disease. Safety data from the use of cipaglucosidase alfa in combination with miglustat was primarily obtained from one clinical trial (Trial 1, NCT03729362). Data from two other trials (Trial 2/NCT02675465 and Trial 3/NCT04138277) were also reviewed for completeness of the safety assessment. The three trials enrolled 151 participants with late-onset Pompe disease. The trials were conducted at 61 sites in 24 countries around the world, including the United States. In Trial 1, 123 adults with late-onset Pompe disease received either cipaglucosidase alfa intravenously once every two weeks for 52 weeks in combination with miglustat, or another medication (called the active comparator) intravenously once every two weeks for 52 weeks in combination with placebo. Of the 123 participants, 95 previously received enzyme replacement therapy, and 28 never received enzyme replacement therapy before the trial. Neither the participants nor the healthcare providers knew which treatment was being given until after Week 52.

== Society and culture ==
=== Legal status ===
Cipaglucosidase alfa is available in the UK, since June 2021, under the Early Access to Medicines Scheme.

In December 2022, the Committee for Medicinal Products for Human Use (CHMP) of the European Medicines Agency (EMA) adopted a positive opinion, recommending the granting of a marketing authorization for the medicinal product Pombiliti, intended for the treatment of glycogen storage disease type II (Pompe disease). The applicant for this medicinal product is Amicus Therapeutics Europe Limited. Cipaglucosidase alfa was approved for medical use in the European Union in March 2023.

=== Names ===
Cipaglucosidase alfa is the international nonproprietary name (INN).
