= N-acetylgalactosamine-6-sulfatase =

Identifiers
- EC no.: 3.1.6.4
- CAS no.: 9025-60-9

Databases
- IntEnz: IntEnz view
- BRENDA: BRENDA entry
- ExPASy: NiceZyme view
- KEGG: KEGG entry
- MetaCyc: metabolic pathway
- PRIAM: profile
- PDB structures: RCSB PDB PDBe PDBsum
- Gene Ontology: AmiGO / QuickGO
Search
- PMC: articles
- PubMed: articles
- NCBI: proteins

The enzyme N-acetylgalactosamine-6-sulfatase (EC 3.1.6.4) catalyzes the chemical reaction of cleaving off the 6-sulfate groups of the N-acetyl-D-galactosamine 6-sulfate units of the macromolecule chondroitin sulfate and, similarly, of the D-galactose 6-sulfate units of the macromolecule keratan sulfate.

This enzyme belongs to the family of hydrolases, specifically those acting on sulfuric ester bonds. The systematic name of this enzyme class is N-acetyl-D-galactosamine-6-sulfate 6-sulfohydrolase. Other names in common use include chondroitin sulfatase, chondroitinase, galactose-6-sulfate sulfatase, acetylgalactosamine 6-sulfatase, N-acetylgalactosamine-6-sulfate sulfatase, and N-acetylgalactosamine 6-sulfatase. This enzyme participates in glycosaminoglycan degradation and degradation of glycan structures.

== Deficiency ==
Morquio syndrome is a rare birth defect caused by a deficiency in this essential enzyme. Treatment options include enzyme replacement therapy with a synthetic version of the enzyme called elosulfase alfa.
