= Philippe Gaucher =

French dermatologist

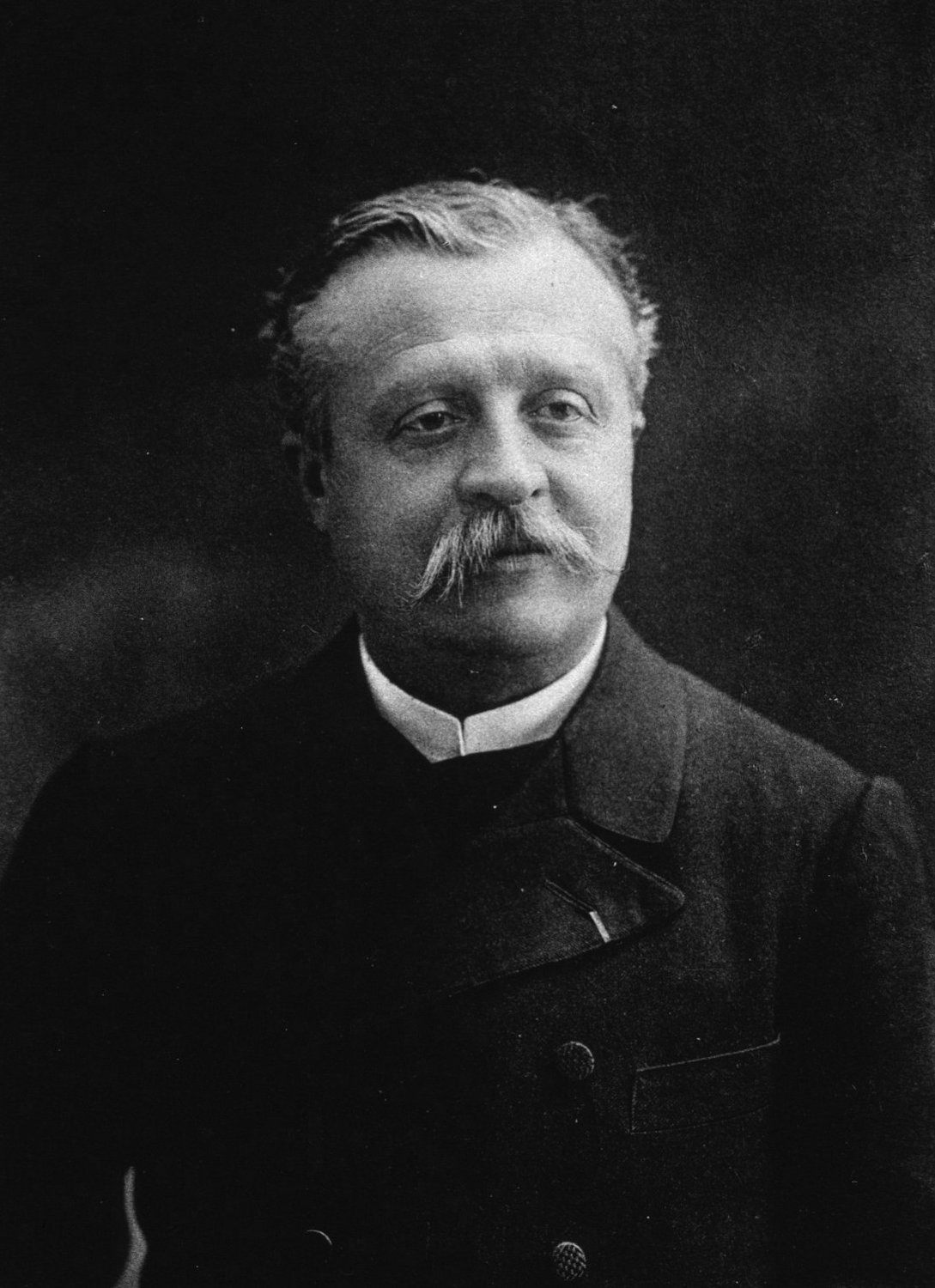
Philippe Gaucher

Philippe Charles Ernest Gaucher (/ɡoʊˈʃeɪ/) (July 26, 1854 – January 25, 1918) was a French dermatologist born in the department of Nièvre.

He received his medical doctorate in 1882, and soon after headed a medical clinic at Necker Hospital. During the subsequent years he was an instructor at several hospital clinics in Paris. He taught classes on pathological anatomy, bacteriology and histology, as well as dermatology. In 1902 he succeeded Jean Alfred Fournier (1832–1914) as the university chair of dermatology and syphilography. Gaucher was also founder of a journal on venereal disease called Annales des Maladies Vénériennes.

He is remembered for providing a description of a disorder that was to become known as Gaucher's disease. In 1882 while still a student, he discovered the disease in a 32-year-old woman who had an enlarged spleen. At the time, Gaucher thought it to be a form of splenetic cancer, and published his findings in his doctorate thesis, titled De l'epithelioma primitif de la rate, hypertrophie idiopathique de la rate sans leucemie. However, it was not until 1965 that the true biochemical nature of Gaucher's disease was understood.
