= Elosulfase alfa =

Pharmaceutical drug

Clinical data
- Trade names: Vimizim
- AHFS/Drugs.com: Multum Consumer Information
- License data: EU EMA: by INN; US DailyMed: Elosulfase alfa
- Routes of administration: Intravenous
- ATC code: A16AB12 (WHO)

Legal status
- Legal status: AU: S4 (Prescription only); US: WARNINGRx-only

Identifiers
- CAS Number: 9025-60-9
- IUPHAR/BPS: 7392
- DrugBank: DB09051
- ChemSpider: none
- UNII: ODJ69JZG85
- KEGG: D10333

Chemical and physical data
- Formula: C_{5020}H_{7588}N_{1364}O_{1418}S_{34}
- Molar mass: 110826.09 g·mol^{−1}

Elosulfase alfa, sold under the brand name Vimizim, is a medication used for the treatment of Morquio syndrome which is caused by a deficiency in the enzyme N-acetylgalactosamine-6-sulfatase. Elosulfase alfa is a synthetic version of this enzyme.

Elosulfase alfa was developed by BioMarin Pharmaceutical Inc. and approved for use in the US by the Food and Drug Administration in 2014.

Elosulfase alfa is used in enzyme replacement therapy; a 2014 study confirmed it was effective on young patients with Morquio syndrome type A. Treatment with this medication was most effective upon respiratory symptoms, activities of daily living and growth, as confirmed in a 2015 paper.

The cost of elosulfase alfa in some countries is $2,080,000-$6,240,000 a year, which has made it difficult for some health systems to afford it.

In June 2019, a Belgian court issued a preliminary injunction forcing BioMarin to continue supplying Vimizim to a young girl suffering from Morquio syndrome free of charge. BioMarin stopped providing the drug for free at the beginning of the year after negotiations with Belgian health authorities regarding reimbursement of the product repeatedly failed. This caused the parents to start legal proceedings to force the company to keep providing the medicine free of charge. BioMarin was ordered to keep doing so until a definitive judgment would be rendered, or until the medicine would be available on the Belgian market at a reasonable price.
