= Pegunigalsidase alfa =

Enzyme replacement therapy medication

Clinical data
- Trade names: Elfabrio
- Other names: PRX-102, pegunigalsidase alfa-iwxj
- AHFS/Drugs.com: Monograph
- MedlinePlus: a623031
- License data: US DailyMed: Pegunigalsidase alfa
- Routes of administration: Intravenous
- Drug class: Lysosomal enzymes
- ATC code: A16AB20 (WHO)

Legal status
- Legal status: CA: ℞-only / Schedule D; US: ℞-only; EU: Rx-only

Identifiers
- CAS Number: 1644392-61-9
- DrugBank: DB14992
- UNII: 8M7V7Q6537
- KEGG: D11685

Chemical and physical data
- Formula: C_{2060}H_{3130}N_{552}O_{601}S_{27}
- Molar mass: 46110.58 g·mol^{−1}

Pegunigalsidase alfa, sold under the brand name Elfabrio, is an enzyme replacement therapy for the treatment of Fabry disease. It is a recombinant human α-galactosidase-A. It is a hydrolytic lysosomal neutral glycosphingolipid-specific enzyme.

The most common side effects are infusion-related reactions, hypersensitivity and asthenia.

Pegunigalsidase alfa was approved for medical use in both the European Union and the United States in May 2023.

== Medical uses ==
Pegunigalsidase alfa is indicated for long-term enzyme replacement therapy in adults with a confirmed diagnosis of Fabry disease (deficiency of alpha-galactosidase).

== Society and culture ==
=== Legal status ===
In February 2023, the Committee for Medicinal Products for Human Use of the European Medicines Agency adopted a positive opinion, recommending the granting of a marketing authorization for the medicinal product Elfabrio, intended for the treatment of Fabry disease. The applicant for this medicinal product is Chiesi Farmaceutici S.p.A. Elfabrio was approved for medical use in the European Union in May 2023.
