= Mikael Bols =

Danish chemist

- Born: July 28, 1961 (age 65); Copenhagen, Denmark
- Citizenship: Denmark
- Education: Technical University of Denmark
- Known for: Discovery of Isofagomines, the different electronic effects of axial and equatorial OH groups and his work on artificial enzymes
- Scientific career
- Fields: Organic chemistry
- Workplaces: Technical University of Denmark, Queen's University, University of Aarhus, University of Copenhagen
- Doctoral advisor: Inge Lundt

Mikael Bols (born July 28, 1961) is a synthetic organic chemist who is mainly known for his work on carbohydrates and artificial enzymes.

== Early life ==
Mikael Bols was born and grew up in Copenhagen, Denmark. He attended high school (Gentofte Statskole) from 1977 to 1980, and took a degree as chemical engineer at the Technical University of Denmark from 1980 to 1985.

== Professional career ==
From 1985 to 1988, Bols did PhD with Professor Inge Lundt at the Technical University of Denmark. From 1988 to 1989, he did a post doc with professor Walter Szarek at Queen's University before joining Leo Pharmaceuticals in 1989. From 1991 to 1995, he was Ass. Prof. at DTU only interrupted by a visit in the last 6 month of 1994 Gilbert Stork's group at Columbia University. From 1995 to 2000, he was Assoc. Prof. (Lektor) at University of Aarhus during which period he became Dr. Scient. (1997). From 1998 to 2000 and from 2004 to 2006, he was Head of the chemistry department at university of Aarhus. From 2000 to 2005, he became Lundbeckfondsprofessor and subsequently (2005-2007) ordinary professor. In 2007, he became professor and Head of department of the Department of Chemistry at University of Copenhagen.

== Achievements ==
The discovery of isofagomine and related glycosidase inhibitors, the discovery of stereoelectronic substituent effects and superarmed glycosyl donors, the creation of artificial enzymes that cause large rate increases., and writing the book "Carbohydrate Building Blocks" about using carbohydrates as a chirality source in synthesis.
