= Glucosylceramidase =

Class of enzymes

glucosylceramidase
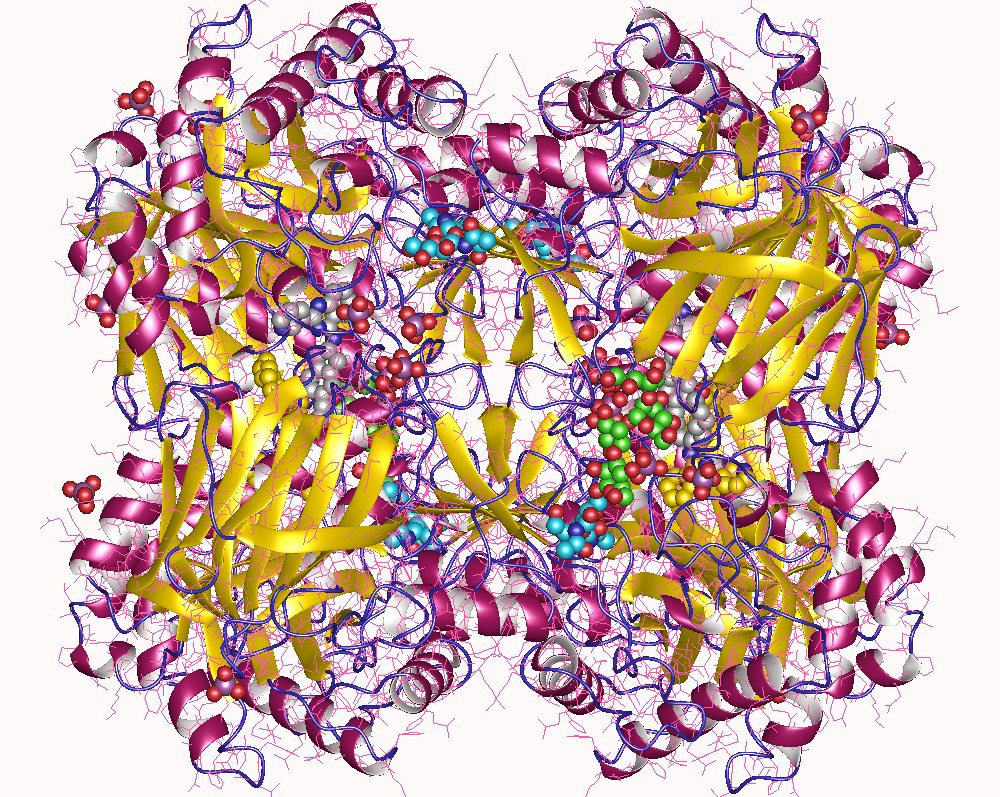
- Glucosylceramidase tetramer, Human

Identifiers
- EC no.: 3.2.1.45
- CAS no.: 37228-64-1

Databases
- BRENDA: enzyme data
- ExPASy: NiceZyme view
- KEGG: enzyme entry
- MetaCyc: metabolic pathway
- Rhea: reactions
- PDB structures: RCSB PDB PDBe PDBsum
- Gene Ontology: AmiGO / QuickGO
Search
- PMC: articles
- PubMed: articles
- NCBI: proteins

In enzymology, a glucosylceramidase (EC 3.2.1.45) is an enzyme that catalyzes the chemical reaction

D-glucosyl-N-acylsphingosine + H_{2}O $\rightleftharpoons$ D-glucose + N-acylsphingosine

Thus, the two substrates of this enzyme are D-glucosyl-N-acylsphingosine and H_{2}O, whereas its two products are D-glucose and N-acylsphingosine.

This enzyme belongs to the family of hydrolases, specifically those glycosidases that hydrolyse O- and S-glycosyl compounds. The systematic name of this enzyme class is D-glucosyl-N-acylsphingosine glucohydrolase. Other names in common use include:

- psychosine hydrolase,
- glucosphingosine glucosylhydrolase,
- GlcCer-beta-glucosidase,
- beta-D-glucocerebrosidase,
- glucosylcerebrosidase,
- beta-glucosylceramidase,
- ceramide glucosidase,
- glucocerebrosidase,
- glucosylsphingosine beta-glucosidase,
- and glucosylsphingosine beta-D-glucosidase.

This enzyme participates in sphingolipid metabolism and degradation of glycan structures.

== Human proteins containing this domain ==
- GBA belongs to Glycoside hydrolase family 30, GBA2 belongs to Glycoside hydrolase family 116.
