= GBA2 =

Protein-coding gene in the species Homo sapiens

Identifiers
- Aliases: GBA2, SPG46, AD035, NLGase, glucosylceramidase beta 2
- External IDs: OMIM: 609471; MGI: 2654325; GeneCards: GBA2
Enzyme activity
EC #	BRENDA	ExPASy	KEGG	MetaCyc
3.2.1.45	↗	↗	↗	↗
3.2.1.46	↗	↗	↗	↗

Gene location (Human)
Chr.	Chromosome 9 (human)
Band	9p13.3	Start	35,736,866 bp
Band	9p13.3	End	35,749,228 bp

Gene location (Mouse)
Chr.	Chromosome 4 (mouse)
Band	4|4 A5	Start	43,566,928 bp
Band	4|4 A5	End	43,578,873 bp
RNA expression pattern
Bgee	Human / Mouse (ortholog); Top expressed in: right hemisphere of cerebellum; transverse colon; mucosa of transverse colon; muscle layer of sigmoid colon; right lobe of thyroid gland; rectum; apex of heart; left lobe of thyroid gland; anterior pituitary; body of stomach / Top expressed in: medial dorsal nucleus; medial geniculate nucleus; ascending aorta; superior frontal gyrus; granulocyte; dorsal tegmental nucleus; seminiferous tubule; nucleus accumbens; subiculum; lateral geniculate nucleus; More reference expression data
BioGPS	n/a
Gene ontology
Molecular function	hydrolase activity, acting on glycosyl bonds; catalytic activity; beta-glucosidase activity; hydrolase activity; hydrolase activity, hydrolyzing O-glycosyl compounds; glucosylceramidase activity; glucosyltransferase activity; steryl-beta-glucosidase activity; transferase activity; glycosyltransferase activity
Cellular component	Golgi apparatus; endoplasmic reticulum membrane; membrane; Golgi membrane; plasma membrane; smooth endoplasmic reticulum; endoplasmic reticulum; integral component of membrane; cytosol; extrinsic component of membrane; extrinsic component of endoplasmic reticulum membrane; extrinsic component of Golgi membrane
Biological process	glycosphingolipid metabolic process; lipid metabolism; bile acid metabolic process; glycoside catabolic process; glucosylceramide catabolic process; central nervous system neuron development; metabolism; sphingolipid metabolic process; central nervous system development; cholesterol metabolic process; lipid glycosylation; regulation of actin filament polymerization; regulation of microtubule polymerization; regulation of membrane lipid distribution; steroid metabolic process
Sources:Amigo / QuickGO
Orthologs
Databases	NCBI: entry; OMA: entry
Species	Human	Mouse
Entrez	57704	230101
Ensembl	ENSG00000070610	ENSMUSG00000028467
UniProt	Q9HCG7	Q69ZF3
RefSeq (mRNA)	NM_020944; NM_001330660	NM_172692
RefSeq (protein)	NP_001317589; NP_065995	NP_766280
Location (UCSC)	Chr 9: 35.74 – 35.75 Mb	Chr 4: 43.57 – 43.58 Mb
PubMed search
- Wikidata
View/Edit Human	View/Edit Mouse

GBA2 is the gene that encodes the enzyme non-lysosomal glucosylceramidase in humans. It has glucosylceramidase (EC 3.2.1.45) activity.

== Function ==
This gene encodes a microsomal beta-glucosidase that catalyzes the hydrolysis of bile acid 3-O-glucosides as endogenous compounds. Studies to determine subcellular localization of this protein in the liver indicated that the enzyme was mainly enriched in the microsomal fraction where it appeared to be confined to the endoplasmic reticulum. This putative transmembrane protein is thought to play a role in carbohydrate transport and metabolism.

== See also ==
- Closely related enzymes
  - GBA: acid β-glucosidase (lysosomal), EC 3.2.1.45
  - GBA3: acid β-glucosidase (cytosolic), EC 3.2.1.21
