= Substrate reduction therapy =

Substrate reduction therapy offers an approach to treatment of certain metabolic disorders, especially glycogen storage diseases and lysosomal storage disorders. In a storage disorder, a critical failure in a metabolic pathway prevents cellular breakdown and disposal of some large molecule. If residual breakdown through other pathways is insufficient to prevent harmful accumulation, the molecule accumulates in the cell and eventually interferes with normal biological processes. Examples of lysosomal storage disorders include Gaucher's disease, Tay–Sachs disease, Sandhoff disease, and Sanfilippo syndrome.

In a metabolic or genetic pathway, enzymes catalyze a series of reactions. Each enzyme is regulated or mediated by one gene through its RNA and protein products. At each phase in the pathway, enzyme activity catalyzes a reaction in which a precursor molecule (the substrate) is transformed into its next intermediate state. Failure of the metabolic pathway leads to accumulation of the substrate, with possible harmful effects. Substrate reduction therapy addresses this failure by reducing the level of the substrate to a point where residual degradative activity is sufficient to prevent substrate accumulation.

== Examples ==
- Tay–Sachs disease. The disease occurs when harmful quantities of a fatty acid derivative called a ganglioside accumulate in the nerve cells of the brain. Gangliosides are lipids, components of cellular membranes, and the ganglioside GM2, implicated in Tay–Sachs disease, is especially common in the nervous tissue of the brain. By manipulating the brain's metabolism of GM2 gangliosides, an effective therapy could potentially be developed. One experiment has demonstrated that, by using the enzyme sialidase, the genetic defect can be effectively bypassed and GM2 gangliosides can be metabolized so that they become almost inconsequential. If a safe pharmacological treatment can be developed, one that causes the increased expression of lysosomal sialidase in neurons, a new form of therapy, essentially curing the disease, could be on the horizon. Metabolic therapies under investigation for Late-Onset TSD include treatment with the drug OGT 918 (Zavesca).
- Gaucher's disease. Miglustat and eliglustat are substrate reduction therapies for Gaucher's disease, inhibiting the synthesis of glucosylceramide.
