= ATC code A16 =

ATC code A16 Other alimentary tract and metabolism products is a therapeutic subgroup of the Anatomical Therapeutic Chemical Classification System, a system of alphanumeric codes developed by the World Health Organization (WHO) for the classification of drugs and other medical products. Subgroup A16 is part of the anatomical group A Alimentary tract and metabolism.

Codes for veterinary use (ATCvet codes) can be created by placing the letter Q in front of the human ATC code: for example, QA16. ATCvet codes without corresponding human ATC codes are cited with the leading Q in the following list.
National versions of the ATC classification may include additional codes not present in this list, which follows the WHO version.

== A16A Other alimentary tract and metabolism products ==
=== A16AA Amino acids and derivatives ===
A16AA01 Levocarnitine
A16AA02 Ademetionine
A16AA03 Levoglutamide
A16AA04 Mercaptamine
A16AA05 Carglumic acid
A16AA06 Betaine
A16AA07 Metreleptin
QA16AA51 Levocarnitine, combinations

=== A16AB Enzymes ===
A16AB01 Alglucerase
A16AB02 Imiglucerase
A16AB03 Agalsidase alfa
A16AB04 Agalsidase beta
A16AB05 Laronidase
A16AB06 Sacrosidase
A16AB07 Alglucosidase alfa
A16AB08 Galsulfase
A16AB09 Idursulfase
A16AB10 Velaglucerase alfa
A16AB11 Taliglucerase alfa
A16AB12 Elosulfase alfa
A16AB13 Asfotase alfa
A16AB14 Sebelipase alfa
A16AB15 Velmanase alfa
A16AB16 Idursulfase beta
A16AB17 Cerliponase alfa
A16AB18 Vestronidase alfa
A16AB19 Pegvaliase
A16AB20 Pegunigalsidase alfa
A16AB21 Atidarsagene autotemcel
A16AB22 Avalglucosidase alfa
A16AB23 Cipaglucosidase alfa
A16AB24 Pegzilarginase
A16AB25 Olipudase alfa
A16AB26 Eladocagene exuparvovec
A16AB27 Pabinafusp alfa
A16AB28 Verenafusp alfa
A16AB29 Rebisufligene etisparvovec

=== A16AX Various alimentary tract and metabolism products ===
A16AX01 Thioctic acid
A16AX02 Anethole trithione
A16AX03 Sodium phenylbutyrate
A16AX04 Nitisinone
A16AX05 Zinc acetate
A16AX06 Miglustat
A16AX07 Sapropterin
A16AX08 Teduglutide
A16AX09 Glycerol phenylbutyrate
A16AX10 Eliglustat
A16AX11 Sodium benzoate
A16AX12 Trientine
A16AX13 Uridine triacetate
A16AX14 Migalastat
A16AX15 Telotristat
A16AX16 Givosiran
A16AX17 Triheptanoin
A16AX18 Lumasiran
A16AX19 Fosdenopterin
A16AX20 Lonafarnib
A16AX21 Elivaldogene autotemcel
A16AX22 Tiomolibdic acid
A16AX23 Leriglitazone
A16AX24 Govorestat
A16AX25 Nedosiran
A16AX26 Glepaglutide
A16AX27 Apraglutide
A16AX28 Sepiapterin
A16AX29 Doxecitine and doxribtimine
A16AX30 Sodium benzoate and sodium phenylacetate

== QA16Q Other alimentary tract and metabolism products for veterinary use ==
=== QA16QA Drugs for prevention and/or treatment of acetonemia ===
QA16QA01 Propylene glycol
QA16QA02 Sodium propionate
QA16QA03 Glycerol
QA16QA04 Ammonium lactate
QA16QA05 Clanobutin
QA16QA06 Monensin
QA16QA52 Sodium propionate, combinations
