= Alglucerase =

Pharmaceutical drug

Clinical data
- AHFS/Drugs.com: Monograph
- MedlinePlus: a692001
- ATC code: A16AB01 (WHO)

Pharmacokinetic data
- Elimination half-life: 3.6–10.4 min

Identifiers
- IUPAC name: Human beta-glucocerebrosidase
- CAS Number: 143003-46-7
- DrugBank: DB00088
- ChemSpider: none
- UNII: 27T56C7KK0
- KEGG: D09675
- ChEMBL: ChEMBL1201633

Chemical and physical data
- Formula: C_{2532}H_{3854}N_{672}O_{711}S_{16}
- Molar mass: 55597.64 g·mol^{−1}

Alglucerase was a biopharmaceutical drug for the treatment of Gaucher's disease. It was a modified form of human β-glucocerebrosidase enzyme, where the non-reducing ends of the oligosaccharide chains have been terminated with mannose residues.

Ceredase is the trade name of a citrate buffered solution of alglucerase that was manufactured by Genzyme Corporation from human placental tissue. It is given intravenously in the treatment of Type 1 Gaucher's disease. This was the first drug approved as an enzyme replacement therapy.

It was approved by the FDA in 1991. It has been withdrawn from the market due to the approval of similar drugs such as imiglucerase made with recombinant DNA technology instead of being harvested from tissue; drugs made recombinantly, since there is no concern about diseases being transmitted from the tissue used in harvesting, and are less expensive to manufacture.
