= Ceramide glucosyltransferase =

Class of enzymes

Identifiers
- EC no.: 2.4.1.80
- CAS no.: 37237-44-8

Databases
- IntEnz: IntEnz view
- BRENDA: BRENDA entry
- ExPASy: NiceZyme view
- KEGG: KEGG entry
- MetaCyc: metabolic pathway
- PRIAM: profile
- PDB structures: RCSB PDB PDBe PDBsum
Search
- PMC: articles
- PubMed: articles
- NCBI: proteins

Ceramide glucosyltransferase (or glucosylceramide synthase) is a glucosyltransferase enzyme involved in the production of glucocerebrosides (also called glucosylceramides). It is responsible for the first step in synthesis of all glycosphingolipids—critical components of cell membranes—from sphingolipids, attaching a glucose molecule (glycosylation) to produce a glucocerebroside product. The enzyme is classified under EC 2.4.1.80.
