= Imiglucerase =

Pharmaceutical drug

Clinical data
- Trade names: Cerezyme
- AHFS/Drugs.com: Monograph
- MedlinePlus: a601149
- License data: EU EMA: by INN; US DailyMed: Imiglucerase
- Routes of administration: Intravenous infusion
- ATC code: A16AB02 (WHO)

Legal status
- Legal status: US: ℞-only; EU: Rx-only

Pharmacokinetic data
- Metabolism: probably proteolysis
- Elimination half-life: 3.6–10.4 min

Identifiers
- IUPAC name: Human beta-glucocerebrosidase
- CAS Number: 154248-97-2
- DrugBank: DB00053
- ChemSpider: none
- UNII: Q6U6J48BWY
- KEGG: D02810
- ChEMBL: ChEMBL1201632

Chemical and physical data
- Formula: C_{2532}H_{3854}N_{672}O_{711}S_{16}
- Molar mass: 55597.4 g·mol^{−1} (unglycosylated)

Imiglucerase is a medication used in the treatment of Gaucher's disease.

It is a recombinant DNA-produced analogue of the human enzyme β-glucocerebrosidase. Cerezyme is a freeze-dried medicine containing imiglucerase, manufactured by Genzyme Corporation. It is given intravenously after reconstitution as a treatment for Type 1 and Type 3 Gaucher's disease. It is available in formulations containing 200 or 400 units per vial. The specific activity of highly purified human enzyme is 890,000 units/mg, meanwhile the enzyme activity produced by recombinant DNA technology is approximately 40 units/mg. A typical dose is 2.5U/kg every two weeks, up to a maximum of 60 U/kg once every two weeks, and safety has been established from ages 2 and up. It is one of more expensive medications, with an annual cost of $200,000 per person in the United States. Imiglucerase has been granted orphan drug status in the United States, Australia, and Japan.

Cerezyme was one of the drugs manufactured at Genzyme's Allston, Massachusetts plant, for which production was disrupted in 2009 after contamination with Vesivirus 2017.

== Side effects ==
The most common side effect is hypersensitivity, which occurs in about 3% of patients. It is associated with symptoms such as cough, shortness of breath, rashes, itching, and angiooedema. Less common side effects include dizziness, headache, nausea, diarrhea, and reactions at the injection site; they are found in less than 1% of patients.

== Interactions ==
No clinical interaction studies have been conducted. Miglustat appears to increase the clearance of imiglucerase by 70%, resulting in decreased enzyme activity.

== See also ==
- Other drugs for the treatment of Gaucher's disease
  - Afegostat (development terminated)
  - Eliglustat
  - Miglustat
  - Velaglucerase alfa
  - taliglucerase alfa
