= Enzyme replacement therapy =

Medical treatment

- Other names: ERT

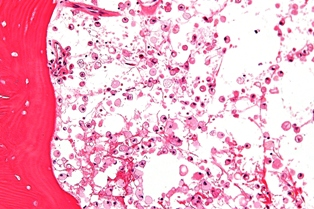

Enzyme replacement therapy (ERT) is a medical treatment which replaces an enzyme that is deficient or absent in the body. Usually, this is done by giving the patient an intravenous (IV) infusion of a solution containing the enzyme.

ERT is available for some lysosomal storage diseases: Gaucher disease, Fabry disease, MPS I, MPS II (Hunter syndrome), MPS VI and Pompe disease. ERT does not correct the underlying genetic defect, but it increases the concentration of the enzyme that the patient is lacking. ERT has also been used to treat patients with severe combined immunodeficiency (SCID) resulting from an adenosine deaminase deficiency (ADA-SCID).

Other treatment options for patients with enzyme or protein deficiencies include substrate reduction therapy, gene therapy, and bone-marrow derived stem cell transplantation.

== History ==
ERT was developed in 1964 by Christian de Duve and Roscoe Brady. Leading work was done on this subject at the Department of Physiology at the University of Alberta by Mark J. Poznansky and Damyanti Bhardwaj, where a model for enzyme therapy was developed using rats. ERT was not used in clinical practice until 1991, after the FDA gave orphan drug approval for the treatment of Gaucher disease with Alglucerase. ERTs were initially manufactured by isolating the therapeutic enzyme from human placenta. The FDA has approved ERTs that are derived from other human cells, animal cells (i.e. Chinese hamster ovary cells, or CHO cells), and plant cells.

== Medical uses ==
Lysosomal storage diseases are a group of diseases and a main application of ERT. Lysosomes are cellular organelles that are responsible for the metabolism of many different macromolecules and proteins. They use enzymes to break down macromolecules, which are recycled or disposed. As of 2012, there are 50 lysosomal storage diseases, and more are still being discovered. These disorders arise because of genetic mutations that prevent the production of certain enzymes used in the lysosomes. The missing enzyme often leads to a build-up of the substrate within the body. This can result in a variety of symptoms, many of which are severe and can affect the skeleton, brain, skin, heart, and the central nervous system. Increasing the concentration of the missing enzyme within the body has been shown to improve the body's normal cellular metabolic processes and reduce substrate concentration in the body.

ERT has also been successful in treating severe combined immunodeficiency caused by an adenosine deaminase deficiency (ADA-SCID). This is a fatal childhood disease that requires early medical intervention. When the enzyme adenosine deaminase is deficient in the body, the result is a toxic build-up of metabolites that impair lymphocyte development and function. Many ADA deficient children with SCID have been treated with the polyethylene glycol-conjugated adenosine deaminase (PEG-ADA) enzyme. This is a form of ERT that has resulted in healthier, longer lives for patients with ADA-SCID.

Diseases and corresponding enzyme therapies. Information in this table is from pivotal clinical trials.
Disease	Enzyme	Administration
Fabry disease	Agalsidase beta	IV
Fabry disease	Agalsidase alfa	IV
Gaucher disease	Imiglucerase	IV
Gaucher disease	Taliglucerase alfa	IV
Gaucher disease	Velaglucerase alfa	IV
Gaucher disease type I	Alglucerase	IV
Lysosomal acid lipase deficiency (Wolman disease/CESD)	Sebelipase alfa	IV
MPS I	Laronidase	IV
MPS II	Idursulfase	IV
MPS II	Tividenofusp alfa	IV
MPS IVA	Elosulfase alfa	IV
MPS VI	Galsulfase	IV
Pompe disease	Alglucosidase alfa (160L bioreactor)	IV
Pompe disease	Alglucosidase alfa (4000L bioreactor)	IV
Thrombotic thrombocytopenic purpura	Apadamtase alfa	IV

== Administration ==
ERT is administered by IV infusion. Typically, infusions occur every week or every two weeks. For some types of ERT, these infusions can occur as infrequently as every four weeks.

== Complications ==
ERT is not a cure for lysosomal storage diseases, and it requires lifelong IV infusions of the therapeutic enzyme. This procedure is expensive; in the United States, it may cost over $200,000 annually. Studies have reported even higher average costs in some settings. For example, reaching approximately €369,000 per year for certain lysosomal storage diseases in Germany. In addition to this, treatment requires frequent infusions that can last several hours and must be administered on a regular basis, which can create ongoing time and logistical burdens for patients. The distribution of the therapeutic enzyme in the body (biodistribution) after these IV infusions is not uniform. The enzyme in less available to certain areas in the body, like the bones, lungs, brain. For this reason, many symptoms of lysosomal storage diseases remain untreated by ERT, especially neurological symptoms. Additionally, the efficacy of ERT is often reduced due to an unwanted immune response against the enzyme, which prevents metabolic function.

== Other treatments for enzyme deficiencies ==
Substrate reduction therapy is another method for treating lysosomal storage diseases. In this treatment, the accumulated compounds are inhibited from forming in the body of a patient with a lysosomal storage disease. The accumulated compounds are responsible for the symptoms of these disorders, and they form via a multi-step biological pathway. Substrate reduction therapy uses a small molecule to interrupt this multi-step pathway and inhibit the biosynthesis of these compounds. This type of treatment is taken orally. It does not induce an unwanted immune response, and a single type of small molecule could be used to treat many lysosomal storage diseases. Substrate reduction therapy is FDA approved and there is at least one treatment available on the market.

Gene therapy aims to replace a missing protein in the body through the use of vectors, usually viral vectors. In gene therapy, a gene encoding for a certain protein is inserted into a vector. The vector containing the therapeutic gene is then injected into the patient. Once inside the body the vector introduces the therapeutic gene into host cells, and the protein encoded by the newly inserted gene is then produced by the body's own cells. This type of therapy can correct for the missing protein/enzyme in patients with lysosomal storage diseases.

Hematopoietic stem cell (HSC) transplantation is another treatment for lysosomal storage diseases. HSCs are derived from bone-marrow. These cells have the ability to mature into the many cell types that comprise blood, including red blood cells, platelets, and white blood cells. Patients with enzyme deficiencies often undergo HSC transplantations in which HSCs from a healthy donor are injected. This treatment introduces HSCs that regularly produce the deficient enzyme since they have normal metabolic function. This treatment is often used to treat the central nervous system of patients with some lysosomal storage diseases.

== See also ==
- Protein replacement therapy
