= Roscoe Brady =

American biochemist

Roscoe Owen Brady
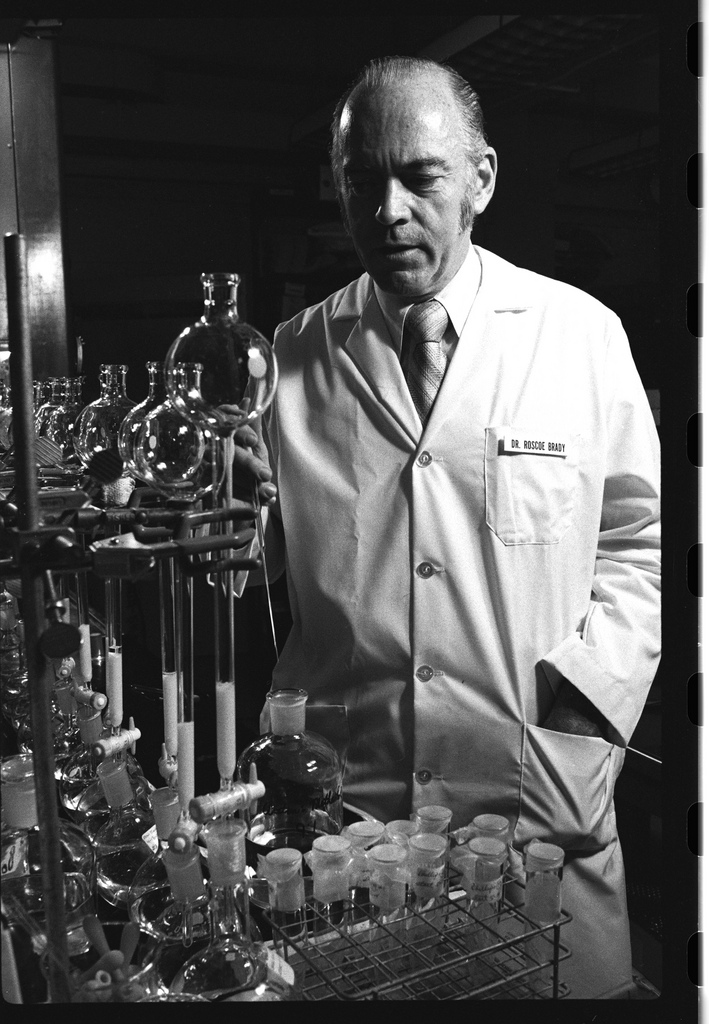
- Roscoe O. Brady c.1970
- Born: October 11, 1923; Philadelphia, Pennsylvania, U.S.
- Died: June 13, 2016 (aged 92)
- Education: Pennsylvania State University, Harvard Medical School (M.D. 1947)
- Occupation: Biochemist
- Known for: Treatment of lysosomal diseases
- Awards: Gairdner Foundation International Award (1973), National Medal of Technology and Innovation
- Scientific career
- Workplaces: University of Pennsylvania School of Medicine, National Institutes of Health

Roscoe Owen Brady (October 11, 1923 – June 13, 2016) was an American biochemist.

He attended the Pennsylvania State University and obtained his M.D. degree from Harvard Medical School in 1947. He interned at the Hospital of the University of Pennsylvania. From 1948 to 1952 he was a post-doctoral fellow in the department of physiological chemistry at the University of Pennsylvania School of Medicine and fellow in clinical medicine in the department of medicine. In collaboration with Samuel Gurin at the University of Pennsylvania, Brady discovered the enzyme system for the biosynthesis of long chain fatty acids, and later discovered the role of malonate coenzyme A in this process. After two and one-half years on active duty in the U.S. Naval Medical Corps, he joined the National Institutes of Health in 1954. He was Chief of the Developmental and Metabolic Neurology Branch in the National Institute of Neurological Disorders and Stroke from 1972 to 2006. Dr. Brady and his colleagues identified the enzymatic defects in Gaucher's disease, Niemann–Pick disease, Fabry disease and the specific metabolic abnormality in Tay–Sachs disease. He and his associates developed diagnostic, carrier detection, prenatal tests for these conditions, and effective enzyme replacement therapy for patients with Gaucher disease and Fabry disease. These were the first-ever enzyme replacement therapy (ERT) treatments for lysosomal diseases, and directly led to great advances in the development of enzyme replacement therapies for some of the other lysosomal diseases, by many different researchers who were inspired by Dr. Brady. (An international research and development effort for new ERT for several devastating lysosomal diseases continues today at an intense pace, and numerous ERT clinical trials are underway.) Late in his life, Dr. Brady was investigating substrate depletion, molecular chaperone therapy, and gene therapy for patients with metabolic storage disorders.

Among his numerous awards, Dr. Brady received the Borden Undergraduate Award from Harvard Medical School in 1947; the Gairdner Foundation International Award in 1973; the Cotzias Award from the American Academy of Neurology in 1980; the Passano Foundation Award and the Lasker Foundation Award in 1982; the Sachs Award from the Child Neurology Society in 1990; the Kovalenko Medal from the National Academy of Sciences USA in 1991; and the Alpert Foundation Prize from Harvard Medical School in 1992. He received an honorary PhD degree from the University of Uppsala in 2005. Dr. Brady was awarded the National Medal of Technology and Innovation in 2008 by President George W. Bush. He was a member of the National Academy of Sciences and the Institute of Medicine of the National Academy of Sciences.

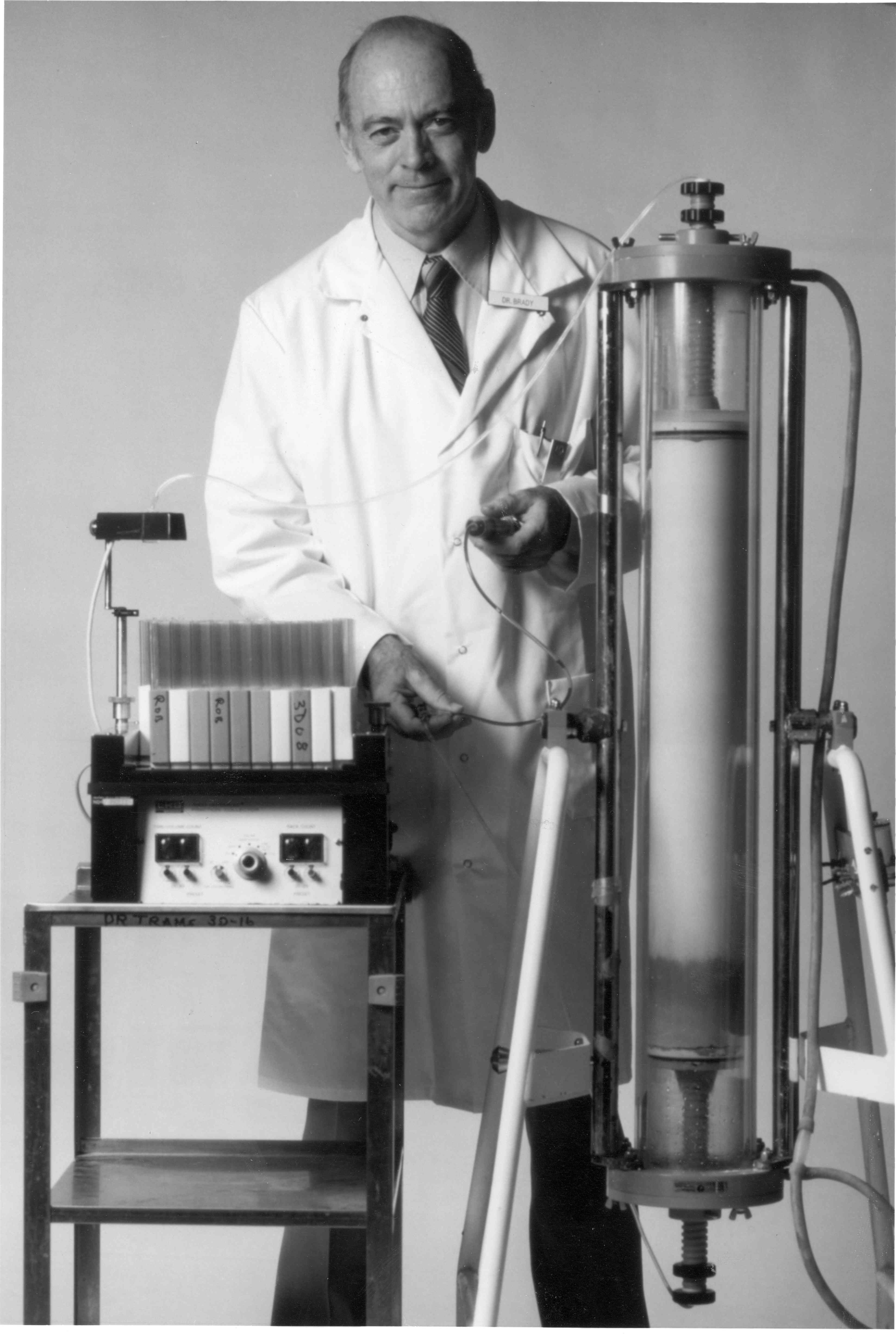
Dr. Brady developed the first enzyme replacement therapy for Gaucher Disease, which has become a model for treatments of other inherited enzymatic diseases. Here he is standing next to a column chromatograph.

Dr. Brady died on June 13, 2016, at his home in Rockville, MD, with his wife and sons at his side after a long battle with cancer.
