= Taliglucerase alfa =

Pharmaceutical drug

Clinical data
- Trade names: Elelyso, others
- AHFS/Drugs.com: Monograph
- Pregnancy category: AU: B1
- Routes of administration: Intravenous infusion
- ATC code: A16AB11 (WHO)

Legal status
- Legal status: AU: S4 (Prescription only); US: ℞-only; In general: ℞ (Prescription only)

Pharmacokinetic data
- Elimination half-life: 18.9-28.7 minutes

Identifiers
- CAS Number: 37228-64-1
- DrugBank: DB08876
- ChemSpider: none
- UNII: 0R4NLX88O4
- KEGG: D09675
- ChEMBL: ChEMBL1964120

Chemical and physical data
- Formula: C_{2580}H_{3918}N_{680}O_{727}S_{17}
- Molar mass: 56638.78 g·mol^{−1}

Taliglucerase alfa, sold under the brand name Elelyso among others, is a biopharmaceutical medication developed by Protalix and Pfizer. The drug, a recombinant glucocerebrosidase used to treat Gaucher's disease, is the first plant-made pharmaceutical to win approval by the U.S. Food and Drug Administration (FDA). Each vial has 200 units of taliglucerase alfa.

== Approval history ==
The US FDA New Drug Application (NDA) was granted approval in May 2012, for use in adults. The US FDA Supplemental New Drug Application (sNDA) for pediatric use was granted approved in August 2014. In Israel, the Israeli Ministry of Health granted approval in September 2012. In Brazil, the Brazilian Health Surveillance Agency (ANVISA) granted approval in March 2013. In Canada, Health Canada issued a Notice of Compliance in May 2014, for both adults and pediatric patients.

Taliglucerase alfa is made by the Israeli biotherapeutics company Protalix and sold by the American pharmaceutical company Pfizer.

== Society and culture ==
=== Economics ===
For 2016, Elelyso was ranked third for pharmaceuticals with the highest cost-per-patient, with an average cost of $483,242 per year.
