= Velaglucerase alfa =

Pharmaceutical drug

Clinical data
- Trade names: Vpriv
- AHFS/Drugs.com: Monograph
- License data: US DailyMed: Velaglucerase alfa
- Routes of administration: Intravenous
- ATC code: A16AB10 (WHO)

Legal status
- Legal status: AU: S4 (Prescription only); US: ℞-only; EU: Rx-only; In general: ℞ (Prescription only)

Pharmacokinetic data
- Bioavailability: N/A
- Elimination half-life: Plasma: 5–12 minutes (absorbed by macrophages)

Identifiers
- CAS Number: 884604-91-5
- DrugBank: DB06720
- ChemSpider: none
- UNII: 23HYE36B0I
- KEGG: D09029
- ChEMBL: ChEMBL1201865

Chemical and physical data
- Formula: C_{2532}H_{3850}N_{672}O_{711}S_{16}
- Molar mass: 55593.61 g·mol^{−1}

Velaglucerase alfa, sold under the brand name Vpriv, is a medication used for the treatment of Gaucher disease Type 1. It is a hydrolytic lysosomal glucocerebroside-specific enzyme, which is a recombinant form of glucocerebrosidase. It has an identical amino acid sequence to the naturally occurring enzyme. It is manufactured by Shire plc.

The most common side effects include abdominal (belly) pain, headache, dizziness, bone pain, arthralgia (joint pain), back pain, infusion-related reactions, asthenia (weakness) or fatigue (tiredness), and pyrexia (fever) or increased body temperature.

Velaglucerase alfa was approved for medical use in the United States in February 2010, and in the European Union in August 2010.

== Medical uses ==
Velaglucerase alfa is indicated for long-term enzyme-replacement therapy (ERT) in people with type-1 Gaucher disease.
