= Glucocerebrosidase =

Mammalian protein found in humans

GBA

Identifiers
- Aliases: GBA, GBA1, GCB, GLUC, glucosylceramidase beta, Glucocerebrosidase
- External IDs: OMIM: 606463; MGI: 95665; GeneCards: GBA
Available structures
PDB	Ortholog search: PDBe RCSB
PDB	List of PDB id codes 1OGS, 1Y7V, 2F61, 2J25, 2NSX, 2NT0, 2NT1, 2V3D, 2V3E, 2V3F, 2VT0, 2WCG, 2WKL, 2XWD, 2XWE, 3GXD, 3GXF, 3GXI, 3GXM, 3KE0, 3KEH, 3RIK, 3RIL
Enzyme activity
EC #	BRENDA	ExPASy	KEGG	MetaCyc
3.2.1.45	↗	↗	↗	↗
3.2.1.46	↗	↗	↗	↗

Gene location (Human)
Chr.	Chromosome 1 (human)
Band	1q22	Start	155,234,452 bp
Band	1q22	End	155,244,699 bp

Gene location (Mouse)
Chr.	Chromosome 3 (mouse)
Band	3 F1|3 39.01 cM	Start	89,110,235 bp
Band	3 F1|3 39.01 cM	End	89,116,273 bp
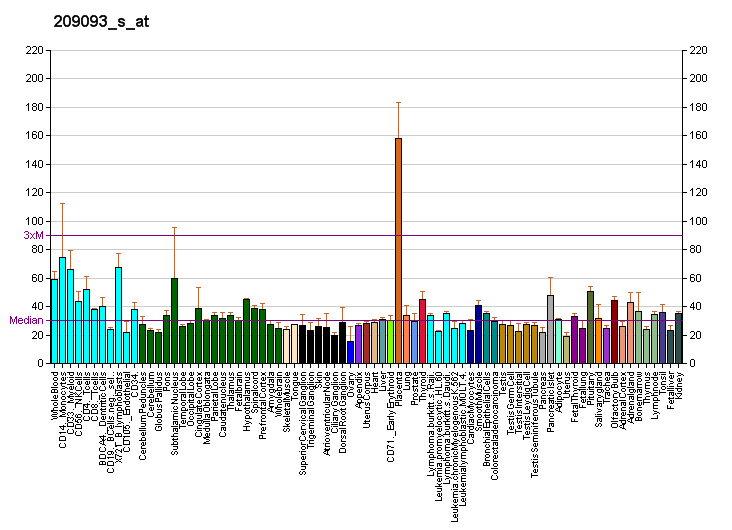

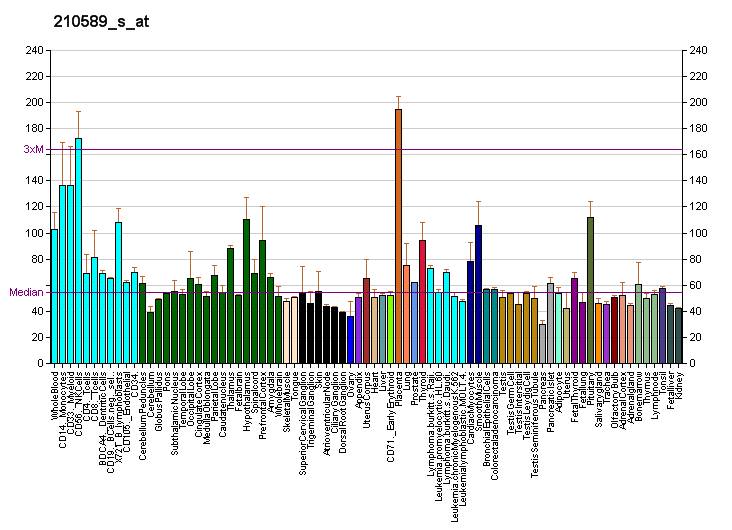
RNA expression pattern
Bgee	Human / Mouse (ortholog); Top expressed in: stromal cell of endometrium; islet of Langerhans; placenta; blood; pituitary gland; anterior pituitary; bone marrow cell; right adrenal gland; right adrenal cortex; left adrenal gland / Top expressed in: esophagus; internal carotid artery; external carotid artery; lip; stroma of bone marrow; superior surface of tongue; decidua; fossa; endothelial cell of lymphatic vessel; motor neuron; More reference expression data
BioGPS	More reference expression data
Gene ontology
Molecular function	hydrolase activity, acting on glycosyl bonds; protein binding; hydrolase activity; signaling receptor binding; glucosylceramidase activity
Cellular component	membrane; lysosome; extracellular exosome; lysosomal lumen; lysosomal membrane; extracellular space
Biological process	termination of signal transduction; skin morphogenesis; glycosphingolipid metabolic process; positive regulation of protein dephosphorylation; lipid metabolism; response to testosterone; cellular response to starvation; negative regulation of interleukin-6 production; response to thyroid hormone; ceramide biosynthetic process; cellular response to tumor necrosis factor; sphingosine biosynthetic process; positive regulation of proteolysis involved in cellular protein catabolic process; regulation of water loss via skin; response to estrogen; glucosylceramide catabolic process; negative regulation of MAP kinase activity; response to pH; metabolism; negative regulation of inflammatory response; regulation of macroautophagy; sphingolipid metabolic process; mitochondrion organization; neuron projection development; regulation of cellular protein metabolic process; positive regulation of proteasomal ubiquitin-dependent protein catabolic process; negative regulation of protein homooligomerization; cell death in response to oxidative stress; positive regulation of protein-containing complex disassembly; regulation of protein metabolic process; negative regulation of neuron death; positive regulation of protein lipidation; positive regulation of neuronal action potential; positive regulation of autophagy of mitochondrion in response to mitochondrial depolarization; autophagosome organization; regulation of lysosomal protein catabolic process; beta-glucoside catabolic process; response to dexamethasone
Sources:Amigo / QuickGO
Orthologs
Databases	NCBI: entry; OMA: entry
Species	Human	Mouse
Entrez	2629	14466
Ensembl	ENSG00000262446; ENSG00000177628	ENSMUSG00000028048
UniProt	P04062	P17439
RefSeq (mRNA)	NM_000157; NM_001005741; NM_001005742; NM_001005749; NM_001005750 NM_001171811; NM_001171812	NM_001077411; NM_008094
RefSeq (protein)	NP_000148; NP_001005741; NP_001005742; NP_001165282; NP_001165283	NP_001070879; NP_032120
Location (UCSC)	Chr 1: 155.23 – 155.24 Mb	Chr 3: 89.11 – 89.12 Mb
PubMed search
- Wikidata
View/Edit Human	View/Edit Mouse

β-Glucocerebrosidase (also called acid β-glucosidase, D-glucosyl-N-acylsphingosine glucohydrolase, or GCase) is an enzyme with glucosylceramidase activity (EC 3.2.1.45) that cleaves by hydrolysis the β-glycosidic linkage of the chemical glucocerebroside, an intermediate in glycolipid metabolism that is abundant in cell membranes (particularly skin cells). It is localized in the lysosome, where it remains associated with the lysosomal membrane. β-Glucocerebrosidase is 497 amino acids in length and has a molecular mass of 59,700 Da.

== Structure ==
β-Glucocerebrosidase is a member of the glycoside hydrolase family 30 and consists of three distinct domains (I-III).

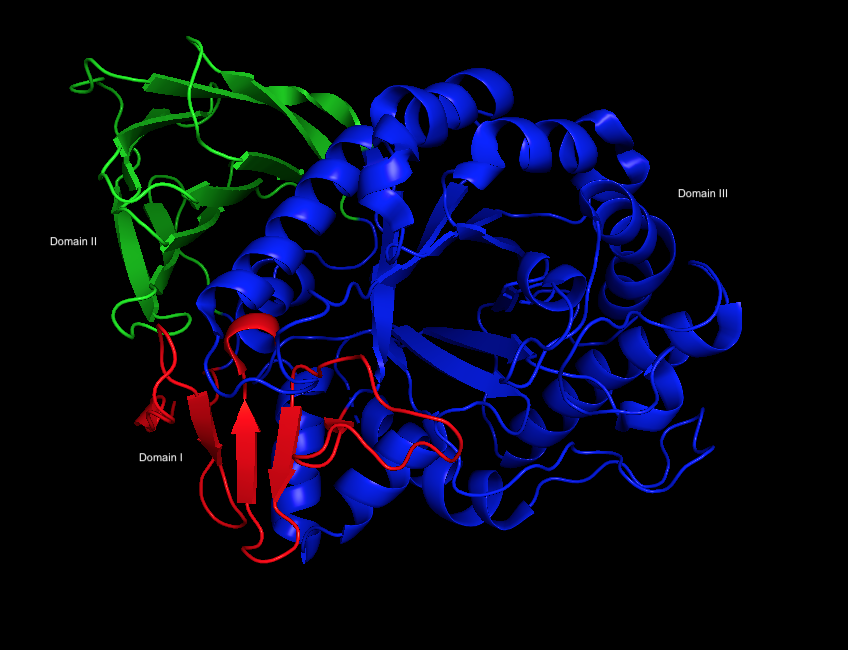
Three-dimensional PyMol rendering of glucocerebrosidase with three domains highlighted.

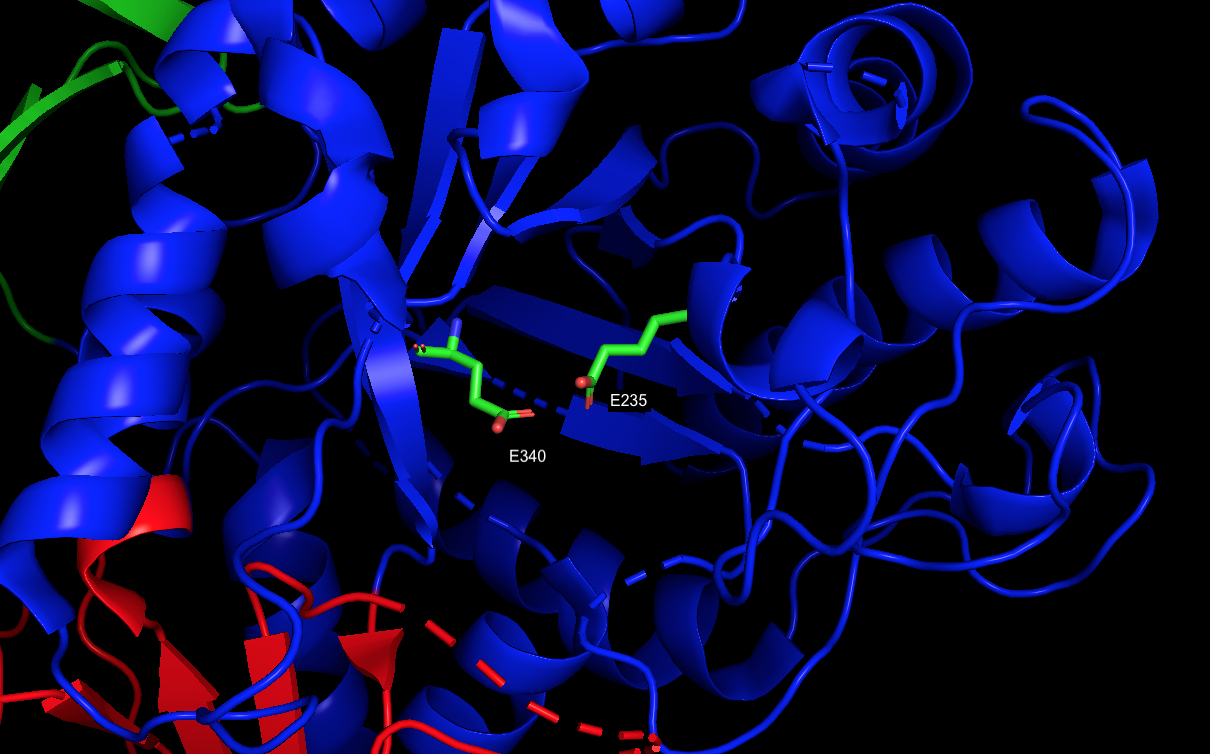
Three-dimensional PyMol rendering of glucocerebrosidase with catalytic residues highlighted.

Domain I (residues 1–27 and 383–414) forms a three-stranded anti-parallel β-sheet. This domain contains two disulfide bridges that are necessary for correct folding, as well as a glycosylated residue (Asn19) that is required for catalytic activity in vivo. Domain II (residues 30–75 and 431–497) consists of two β-sheets that resemble an immunoglobulin fold. Domain III (residues 76–381 and 416–430) is homologous to a TIM barrel and is a highly conserved domain among glycoside hydrolases. Domain III harbors the active site, which binds the substrate glucocerebroside in close proximity to the catalytic residues E340 and E235. Domains I and III are tightly associated, while domains II and III are joined by a disordered linker.

== Mechanism ==
Crystal structures indicate that β-glucocerebrosidase binds the glucose moiety and adjacent O-glycosydic bond of glucocerebroside. The two aliphatic chains of glucocerebroside may remain associated with the lysosomal bilayer or interact with the activating protein Saposin C.

Consistent with other glycoside hydrolases, the mechanism of glucocerebroside hydrolysis by β-glucocerebrosidase involves acid/base catalysis by two glutamic acid residues (E340 and E235) and precedes through a two-step mechanism. In the first step, E340 performs a nucleophilic attack at the carbon of the O-glycosidic linkage to displace the sphingosine moiety, which is simultaneously protonated by E235 as it is released from the active site. In the second step, glucose is hydrolyzed from the E340 residue to regenerate the active enzyme.

== Properties ==
β-Glucocerebrosidase is maximally active at pH 5.5, the pH of the lysosomal compartment. Within the lysosome it remains associated with the membrane, where it binds and degrades its substrate glucocerebroside (GluCer). It requires the activating protein Saposin C as well as negatively charged lipids for maximal catalytic activity. The role of Saposin C is not known; however, it is shown to bind both the lysosomal membrane and the lipid moieties of GluCer, and therefore may recruit GluCer to the active site of the enzyme.

β-Glucocerebrosidase is specifically and irreversibly inhibited by the glucose analog Conduritol B epoxide. Conduritol B epoxide binds to the GCase active site, where the enzyme cleaves its epoxide ring, forming a permanent covalent bond between the enzyme and the inhibitor.

Initially, GCase was thought to be one of the few lysosomal enzymes that does not follow the mannose-6-phosphate pathway for trafficking to the lysosome. A study in I-cell disease fibroblasts (in which the phosphotransferase that puts Mannose 6-phosphate on proteins to target them to the lysosome is defective) showed targeting of GCase to the lysosome independent of the M6P pathway. The lysosomal transporter and integral membrane protein LIMP-2 (Lysosomal Integral Membrane Protein 2) was shown to bind GCase and facilitate transport to the lysosome, demonstrating a mechanism for M6P-independent lysosomal trafficking. This conclusion was called into question when a crystal structure of GCase in complex with LIMP-2 showed a Mannose 6-phosphate moiety on LIMP-2, suggesting the complex can also follow the traditional mannose-6-phosphate pathway.

== Clinical significance ==
Mutations in the glucocerebrosidase gene cause Gaucher's disease, a lysosomal storage disease characterized by an accumulation of glucocerebrosides in macrophages that infiltrate many vital organs.

Mutations in the glucocerebrosidase gene are also associated with Parkinson's disease.

A related pseudogene is approximately 12 kb downstream of this gene on chromosome 1. Alternative splicing results in multiple transcript variants encoding the same protein.

== Drugs ==
Alglucerase (Ceredase) was a version of glucocerebrosidase that was harvested from human placental tissue and then modified with enzymes. It was approved by the FDA in 1991 but has been withdrawn from the market due to the approval of similar drugs made with recombinant DNA technology instead of being harvested from tissue. Drugs made recombinantly pose no risk of diseases being transmitted from the tissue used in harvesting, and are less expensive to manufacture.

Recombinant glucocerebrosidases used as drugs include:

- Imiglucerase (Cerezyme)
- Velaglucerase (Vpriv)
- Taliglucerase alfa (Elelyso)

== See also ==
- Closely related enzymes
  - GBA2: acid β-glucosidase (bile acid), also EC 3.2.1.45
  - GBA3: acid β-glucosidase (cytosolic), EC 3.2.1.21
