= C20H26O3 =

The molecular formula C_{20}H_{26}O_{3} may refer to:

- Crotogoudin
- Cyclotriol
- Estradiol acetate (EA)
- Estradiol 17β-acetate
- Gestadienol
- Kahweol
