= Catalyst Pharmaceuticals =

US biopharmaceutical company

Catalyst Pharmaceutical Partners, Inc.
- Type: Subsidiary
- Traded as: Nasdaq: CPRX
- Industry: Biotechnology
- Founder: Patrick J. McEnany
- Headquarters: Coral Gables, Florida, U.S.
- Key people: Patrick J. McEnany (chairman Richard Daly (CEO and Board member)
- Products: FIRDAPSE® (amifampridine) Tablets 10 mg (commercialized 2019); AGAMREE® (vamorolone) Oral suspension 40mg/ ml FYCOMPA® (perampanel) CIII
- Operating income: ▲US$ 86.8 million (2023)
- Total assets: US$ 700 million (2023)
- Total equity: US$ 302.9 million (2023)
- Number of employees: 176
- Parent: Angelini Pharma
- Website: www.catalystpharma.com

Catalyst Pharmaceuticals, Inc. is a biopharmaceutical company based in Coral Gables, Florida, United States. The company develops medicines for rare diseases, including the phosphate salt of amifampridine for the treatment of Lambert–Eaton myasthenic syndrome (LEMS). The drug is referred to under the trade name Firdapse, which was approved by the FDA for approved use in children 6 years and older with LEMS in addition to the prior approval for use in adults with LEMS on November 28, 2018. Firdapse commercially launched in January 2019.

== History ==
Catalyst was founded in 2002, and completed an IPO in 2006. It focused primarily on developing therapies to prevent addiction until 2012.

In 2009, Catalyst in-licensed worldwide rights to a family of GABA inhibitors including CPP-115 from Northwestern University. In 2012, it in-licensed patents covering the use of amifampridine phosphate to treat LEMS for the North American market from BioMarin.

In 2012, while BioMarin had a Phase III trial ongoing in the US, it licensed the US rights to 3,4-DAPP, including the orphan designation and the ongoing trial, to Catalyst Pharmaceuticals.

In August 2013, analysts anticipated that FDA approval would be granted to Catalyst in LEMS by 2015. The drug is used to treat Lambert–Eaton myasthenic syndrome (LEMS), which is a rare neuromuscular disorder characterized by muscle weakness of the limbs, affecting about 3.4 per million people.

In December 2015, Catalyst submitted its new drug application to the FDA, and in February 2016 the FDA refused to accept it, on the basis that it wasn't complete. In April 2016 the FDA told Catalyst it would have to gather further data. In March 2018 the company re-submitted its NDA. The FDA approved amifampridine for the treatment of adults with Lambert-Eaton myasthenic syndrome on November 29, 2018.

In 2018, Catalyst terminated its license for CPP-115 with Northwestern and stopped the development program for that compound.

As of 2022, the company offered Catalyst Pathways, a program that provides financial aid, insurance navigation, bridge medicine, and Patient Access Liaisons.

In January 2023, Catalyst acquired the US rights for the epilepsy drug FYCOMPA (perampanel). Fycoma had FDA approvals in 2016 with an oral suspension formulation and in 2017 for its use as a monotherapy.

In October 2023, Patrick J. McEnany retired as CEO. He now serves as Chairman. Richard J. Daly was appointed as CEO on Jan 1, 2024.

In March 2024, Catalyst commercially launched AGAMREE (vamorolone) oral suspension for the treatment of Duchenne muscular dystrophy in patients aged two years and older. Catalyst had acquired the North American rights in July 2023. It had previously been approved by the FDA in October 2023.

In May 2024, the FDA approved a supplemental New Drug Application increasing the indicated maximum daily dose of Firdapse (amifampridine) for adults and pediatric patients weighing more than 45 kg from 80 mg to 100 mg.

== Lambert-Eaton myasthenic syndrome ==
Tentative evidence supports 3,4-diaminopyridine treatment at least for a few weeks, with the goal to improve neuromuscular transmission. The 3,4-diaminopyridine base or the water-soluble 3,4-diaminopyridine phosphate may be used. Both 3,4-diaminopyridine formulations stall the repolarization of nerve terminals after a discharge, allowing more calcium to gather in the terminal.

== Duchenne muscular dystrophy ==
Data from four clinical trials support vamorolone therapy's safety and efficacy profile in DMD. One study compared 48 weeks of treatment Agamree to prednisone, a corticosteroid, in 121 boys with Duchenne muscular dystrophy. Results demonstrated that AGAMREE and prednisone were both effective at preserving muscle function, but children given AGAMREE had fewer adverse reactions related to bone health, growth, and behavior.

== Amifampridine ==
The development of amifampridine and its phosphate has brought attention to orphan drug policies that grant market exclusivity as an incentive for companies to develop therapies for conditions that affect small numbers of people. Amifampridine, also called 3,4-DAP, was discovered in Scotland in the 1970s, and doctors in Sweden first showed its use in LEMS in the 1980s.

== Litigation and Reception ==
In December 2015 a group of neuromuscular doctors published an editorial in the journal, Muscle & Nerve, with concerns about the potential for the price to be increased should Catalyst obtain FDA approval, and stating that 3,4-DAPP represented no real innovation and didn't deserve exclusivity under the Orphan Drug Act. Catalyst responded to this editorial with a response in 2016 that explained they were conducting a full range of clinical and non-clinical studies necessary to obtain approval in order to specifically address the unmet need among the estimated 1500-3000 LEMs patients since about 200 were receiving the product through compassionate use – and that this is exactly what the Orphan Drug Act was intended to do. Prior to the FDA approval, patients were able to get an investigational version of amifampridine for free through compassionate use programs in accordance with FDA Rules and Guidelines.

On January 28, 2022, in Catalyst Pharmaceuticals, Inc. v. Becerra, the Eleventh Circuit upheld orphan exclusivity for Catalyst Pharmaceuticals and its drug Firdapse. With this decision, the Eleventh Circuit rejected the FDA's interpretation of orphan exclusivity and concluded that the agency had improperly approved a competitor product from Jacobus Pharmaceutical Co.

On February 4, 2019, Bernie Sanders, United States Senator from Vermont, publicly sent a letter to Catalyst asking why they raised the price of their drug Firdapse to an annual cost of $375,000, considering Firdapse was previously free of charge through an FDA compassionate use program. Catalyst responded by saying, "The approval of Firdapse by the FDA means that all LEMS patients in the United States now have access to this much-needed medication". Sanders questioned the financial decision regarding the negative impact, specifically asking about how many patients would suffer or die, for patients who may no longer be able to afford the drug. The drug is used to treat Lambert–Eaton myasthenic syndrome (LEMS), which is a rare neuromuscular disorder.
