= C22H28O4 =

The molecular formula C_{22}H_{28}O_{4} may refer to:

- Gestadienol acetate, an orally active progestin
- Vamorolone, a synthetic steroid
- Estradiol diacetate, an estrogen ester
