= Streptomyces flaveolus =

Scientific classification
- Domain: Bacteria
- Kingdom: Bacillati
- Phylum: Actinomycetota
- Class: Actinomycetes
- Order: Streptomycetales
- Family: Streptomycetaceae
- Genus: Streptomyces
- Species: S. flaveolus

Binomial name
- Streptomyces flaveolus (Waksman 1923) Waksman and Henrici 1948 (Approved Lists 1980)

Type strain
- Actinomyces 168, AS 4.1432, ATCC 19754, ATCC 3319, BCRC 12489, CBS 128.20, CBS 493.68, CCM 3171, CCRC 12489, CECT 3181, CGMCC 4.1432, DSM 40061, DSMZ 40061, ETH 12399, HAMBI 893, IAM 117, IAM 5, IAM WI-2, IAW 79, ICMP 392, ICMP 741, IFO 12768, IFO 3408, IFO 3715, IMET 40233, IMRU 3319, ISP 5061, JCM 4032, JCM 4577, KCC S-0032, KCC S-0577, KCTC 9022, Lanoot R-8690, LMG 19328, NBRC 12768, NBRC 3408, NBRC 3715, NIHJ 109, NRRL B-1334, NRRL B-2688, NRRL B-B-2688, NRRL-ISP 5061, NZRCC 10332, OUT 8269, PSA 108, R, R-8690, RIA 1035, RIA 1935, RIA 485, RIA 75, UNIQEM 141, VKM Ac-965, Waksman 3319

Synonyms
- "Actinomyces flaveolus" Waksman 1923

Species of bacterium

Streptomyces flaveolus is a bacterium species from the genus of Streptomyces which has been isolated from soil. Streptomyces flaveolus produces L-isoleucine, actinomycin J and tirandamycin.

== See also ==
- List of Streptomyces species
