= Drisapersen =

Chemical compound

Clinical data
- Trade names: Kyndrisa (proposed)
- Other names: PRO051; GSK2402968
- ATC code: M09AX04 (WHO)

Legal status
- Legal status: Never marketed

Identifiers
- IUPAC name: all-P-ambo-2'-O-methyl-P-thiouridylyl-(3'→5')-2'-O-methyl-P-thiocytidylyl-(3'→5')-2'-O-methyl-P-thioadenylyl-(3'→5')-2'-O-methyl-P-thioadenylyl-(3'→5')-2'-O-methyl-P-thioguanylyl-(3'→5')-2'-O-methyl-P-thioguanylyl-(3'→5')-2'-O-methyl-P-thioadenylyl-(3'→5')-2'-O-methyl-P-thioadenylyl-(3'→5')-2'-O-methyl-P-thioguanylyl-(3'→5')-2'-O-methyl-P-thioadenylyl-(3'→5')-2'-O-methyl-P-thiouridylyl-(3'→5')-2'-O-methyl-P-thioguanylyl-(3'→5')-2'-O-methyl-P-thioguanylyl-(3'→5')-2'-O-methyl-P-thiocytidylyl-(3'→5')-2'-O-methyl-P-thioadenylyl-(3'→5')-2'-O-methyl-P-thiouridylyl-(3'→5')-2'-O-methyl-P-thiouridylyl-(3'→5')-2'-O-methyl-P-thiouridylyl-(3'→5')-2'-O-methyl-P-thiocytidylyl-(3'→5')-2'-O-methyluridine
- CAS Number: 1251830-50-8
- PubChem CID: 121494118
- ChemSpider: none
- UNII: 73D586DAMF
- KEGG: D10114

Chemical and physical data
- Formula: C_{211}H_{275}N_{76}O_{119}P_{19}S_{19}
- Molar mass: 6977.58 g·mol^{−1}
- SMILES: CO[C@@H]1[C@@H]([C@H](O[C@H]1N2C=CC(=O)NC2=O)COP(=S)(O)O[C@@H]3[C@H](O[C@H]([C@@H]3OC)N4C=CC(=NC4=O)N)COP(=S)(O)O[C@@H]5[C@H](O[C@H]([C@@H]5OC)N6C=CC(=O)NC6=O)COP(=S)(O)O[C@@H]7[C@H](O[C@H]([C@@H]7OC)N8C=CC(=O)NC8=O)COP(=S)(O)O[C@@H]9[C@H](O[C@H]([C@@H]9OC)N1C=CC(=O)NC1=O)COP(=S)(O)O[C@@H]1[C@H](O[C@H]([C@@H]1OC)N1C=NC2=C(N=CN=C21)N)COP(=S)(O)O[C@@H]1[C@H](O[C@H]([C@@H]1OC)N1C=CC(=NC1=O)N)COP(=S)(O)O[C@@H]1[C@H](O[C@H]([C@@H]1OC)N1C=NC2=C1N=C(NC2=O)N)COP(=S)(O)O[C@@H]1[C@H](O[C@H]([C@@H]1OC)N1C=NC2=C1N=C(NC2=O)N)COP(=S)(O)O[C@@H]1[C@H](O[C@H]([C@@H]1OC)N1C=CC(=O)NC1=O)COP(=S)(O)O[C@@H]1[C@H](O[C@H]([C@@H]1OC)N1C=NC2=C(N=CN=C21)N)COP(=S)(O)O[C@@H]1[C@H](O[C@H]([C@@H]1OC)N1C=NC2=C1N=C(NC2=O)N)COP(=S)(O)O[C@@H]1[C@H](O[C@H]([C@@H]1OC)N1C=NC2=C(N=CN=C21)N)COP(=S)(O)O[C@@H]1[C@H](O[C@H]([C@@H]1OC)N1C=NC2=C(N=CN=C21)N)COP(=S)(O)O[C@@H]1[C@H](O[C@H]([C@@H]1OC)N1C=NC2=C1N=C(NC2=O)N)COP(=S)(O)O[C@@H]1[C@H](O[C@H]([C@@H]1OC)N1C=NC2=C1N=C(NC2=O)N)COP(=S)(O)O[C@@H]1[C@H](O[C@H]([C@@H]1OC)N1C=NC2=C(N=CN=C21)N)COP(=S)(O)O[C@@H]1[C@H](O[C@H]([C@@H]1OC)N1C=NC2=C(N=CN=C21)N)COP(=S)(O)O[C@@H]1[C@H](O[C@H]([C@@H]1OC)N1C=CC(=NC1=O)N)COP(=S)(O)O[C@@H]1[C@H](O[C@H]([C@@H]1OC)N1C=CC(=O)NC1=O)CO)O
- InChI: InChI=1S/C211H275N76O119P19S19/c1-329-136-116(295)77(369-178(136)271-33-24-99(289)252-206(271)304)40-349-407(310,426)389-118-79(371-180(138(118)331-3)268-30-21-96(212)249-203(268)301)42-351-409(312,428)392-121-81(373-183(141(121)334-6)273-35-26-101(291)254-208(273)306)44-352-410(313,429)393-122-82(374-184(142(122)335-7)274-36-27-102(292)255-209(274)307)45-353-411(314,430)394-123-83(375-185(143(123)336-8)275-37-28-103(293)256-210(275)308)46-355-415(318,434)396-125-85(377-187(145(125)338-10)277-65-238-105-156(215)226-59-232-162(105)277)48-358-413(316,432)391-120-80(372-182(140(120)333-5)270-32-23-98(214)251-205(270)303)43-354-417(320,436)402-131-94(386-193(151(131)344-16)283-71-244-111-168(283)258-198(221)263-173(111)296)57-366-424(327,443)405-132-91(383-194(152(132)345-17)284-72-245-112-169(284)259-199(222)264-174(112)297)54-363-414(317,433)395-124-84(376-186(144(124)337-9)276-38-29-104(294)257-211(276)309)47-356-416(319,435)397-126-89(381-188(146(126)339-11)278-66-239-106-157(216)227-60-233-163(106)278)52-361-422(325,441)403-133-92(384-195(153(133)346-18)285-73-246-113-170(285)260-200(223)265-175(113)298)55-364-420(323,439)400-130-88(380-192(150(130)343-15)282-70-243-110-161(220)231-64-237-167(110)282)51-360-419(322,438)399-128-90(382-190(148(128)341-13)280-68-241-108-159(218)229-62-235-165(108)280)53-362-423(326,442)404-134-95(387-196(154(134)347-19)286-74-247-114-171(286)261-201(224)266-176(114)299)58-367-425(328,444)406-135-93(385-197(155(135)348-20)287-75-248-115-172(287)262-202(225)267-177(115)300)56-365-421(324,440)401-129-87(379-191(149(129)342-14)281-69-242-109-160(219)230-63-236-166(109)281)50-359-418(321,437)398-127-86(378-189(147(127)340-12)279-67-240-107-158(217)228-61-234-164(107)279)49-357-412(315,431)390-119-78(370-181(139(119)332-4)269-31-22-97(213)250-204(269)302)41-350-408(311,427)388-117-76(39-288)368-179(137(117)330-2)272-34-25-100(290)253-207(272)305/h21-38,59-95,116-155,178-197,288,295H,39-58H2,1-20H3,(H,310,426)(H,311,427)(H,312,428)(H,313,429)(H,314,430)(H,315,431)(H,316,432)(H,317,433)(H,318,434)(H,319,435)(H,320,436)(H,321,437)(H,322,438)(H,323,439)(H,324,440)(H,325,441)(H,326,442)(H,327,443)(H,328,444)(H2,212,249,301)(H2,213,250,302)(H2,214,251,303)(H2,215,226,232)(H2,216,227,233)(H2,217,228,234)(H2,218,229,235)(H2,219,230,236)(H2,220,231,237)(H,252,289,304)(H,253,290,305)(H,254,291,306)(H,255,292,307)(H,256,293,308)(H,257,294,309)(H3,221,258,263,296)(H3,222,259,264,297)(H3,223,260,265,298)(H3,224,261,266,299)(H3,225,262,267,300)/t76-,77-,78-,79-,80-,81-,82-,83-,84-,85-,86-,87-,88-,89-,90-,91-,92-,93-,94-,95-,116-,117-,118-,119-,120-,121-,122-,123-,124-,125-,126-,127-,128-,129-,130-,131-,132-,133-,134-,135-,136-,137-,138-,139-,140-,141-,142-,143-,144-,145-,146-,147-,148-,149-,150-,151-,152-,153-,154-,155-,178-,179-,180-,181-,182-,183-,184-,185-,186-,187-,188-,189-,190-,191-,192-,193-,194-,195-,196-,197-,407?,408?,409?,410?,411?,412?,413?,414?,415?,416?,417?,418?,419?,420?,421?,422?,423?,424?,425?/m1/s1; Key:HUGILZFVSVLCAO-XVKRXUDYSA-N

Drisapersen (also known as Kyndrisa, PRO051 and GSK2402968) is an experimental drug that was under development by BioMarin, after acquisition of Prosensa, for the treatment of Duchenne muscular dystrophy.

Drisapersen alters the splicing of the dystrophin RNA transcript, eliminating exon 51 from the mature dystrophin mRNA.

Drisapersen is an antisense oligonucleotide (with the sequence 5'-UCA AGG AAG AUG GCA UUU CU-3') featuring a 2-O-methylribose sugar modification and phosphorothioate linkages.

== Mechanism of action ==
Duchenne muscular dystrophy (DMD) is caused when a mutation in the dystrophin gene changes the RNA so that it no longer codes for functional dystrophin protein. This usually happens due to a mutation that alters the reading frame of the RNA downstream of the mutation, so-called frameshift mutation. If an exon with an appropriate number of bases lies near the mutation, removing that exon can correct the downstream reading frame, restoring the production of partially functional dystrophin. This is the general strategy used in the design of exon-skipping oligonucleotides for DMD. As there are 79 exons in the longest splice form of the dystrophin transcript, many different oligonucleotides are needed to address the range of mutations present in the population of people with DMD.

== Clinical studies ==
The compound has completed Phase III trials and did not meet its primary endpoint. In January 2016, the FDA rejected drisapersen (Kyndrisa) largely on the basis of toxicity which limits dosing, and so efficacy. This effectively shifted focus of exon skipping therapy to a competing drug, eteplirsen. Eteplirsen is another exon skipping drug, but has a different backbone chemistry (it is a Morpholino antisense oligomer) which gives it different pharmacology while still targeting the same site on the dystrophin gene, exon 51. The hope is that lower toxicity of that backbone chemistry will allow higher dosing and greater efficacy.

A long-term open-label extension study (DEMAND IV) suggests that giving the drug at an earlier age and treating the boys for longer may delay progression of the disease. This corresponds with the earlier Phase III trials (DEMAND III) data that shows a potentially clinically meaningful difference in a subgroup of patients age 7 or younger.

== History ==
The Phase III trials were sponsored by GlaxoSmithKline but GSK terminated the collaboration agreement between GSK and Prosensa and Prosensa has regained all rights from GSK to drisapersen. Prosensa was then acquired by BioMarin Pharmaceutical, which continued the development of drisapersen and was concurrently working with similar exon skipping therapies for other exons.

Both drisapersen and the similar drug eteplirsen have filed a New Drug Application (NDA) for review with the US Food and Drug Administration (FDA). In January 2016, the FDA rejected drisapersen (Kyndrisa) after it concluded that the standard of substantial evidence of effectiveness had not been met, effectively shifting focus to rival Sarepta's eteplirsen. The Prescription Drug User Fee Act (PDUFA) goal dates for these are December 27, 2015 for drisapersen and February 26, 2016 for eteplirsen.

== Current status ==
In May 2016, BioMarin announced they intended to discontinue clinical and regulatory development of drisapersen as well as related first generation compounds currently in Phase 2 studies for distinct forms of Duchenne muscular dystrophy. The company claim they will continue to look into DMD and the next generation oligonucleotides.
