= C20H26O2 =

The molecular formula C_{20}H_{26}O_{2} (molar mass: 298.41 g/mol, exact mass: 298.19328) may refer to:

- Atamestane, an aromatase inhibitor
- Benzestrol
- Cyclodiol, a synthetic estrogen
- Dimethyltrienolone
- Methestrol
- Norethisterone
- Noretynodrel, a progestin
- RU-2309
- 8β-VE2
