= Amicus Therapeutics =

American harmaceutical company

Amicus Therapeutics, Inc.
- Type: Subsidiary
- Traded as: Nasdaq: FOLD; Russell 2000 component
- Industry: Biotechnology
- Founded: February 4, 2002; 24 years ago
- Headquarters: Princeton, New Jersey, United States
- Key people: John Crowley (chairman emeritus); Bradley Campbell (president and COO); Daphne Quimi (CFO); David Clark (chief people officer)
- Revenue: ▲$91,245,000 (2018); ▲$36,930,000 (2017)
- Operating income: ▲ ($328,777,000) (2018); ▼ ($441,985,000) (2017)
- Net income: ▲ ($349,089,000) (2018); ▼ ($449,121,000) (2017)
- Total assets: ▲$789,951,000 (2018); ▼$627,024,000 (2017)
- Total equity: ▼$342,912,000 (2018); ▼$352,850,000 (2017)
- Number of employees: 508 (31 Dec 2018)
- Website: www.amicusrx.com

Amicus Therapeutics, Inc. is an American biopharmaceutical company based in Princeton, New Jersey. The company went public in 2007 under the Nasdaq trading symbol FOLD. This followed a 2006 planned offering and subsequent withdrawal, which would have established the trading symbol as AMTX Prior to their IPO, Amicus was funded by a variety of venture capital firms including Radius Ventures, Canaan Partners and New Enterprise Associates. As of April 2026, Amicus Therapeutics is a subsidiary of BioMarin Pharmaceutical.

== History ==
The therapeutic focus of Amicus is on rare and orphan diseases, particularly disorders collectively called lysosomal storage disorders. The company has focused on pharmacological chaperones and enzyme replacement therapy.

In 2008, the company expanded from its single site in New Jersey to a second research site in San Diego.

In late 2009, the company faced a major financial setback with the termination of a multi-year collaboration agreement with Shire for its lead compound, migalastat, and two other products. Amicus cut 20% of its workforce.

The next year, the company signed an exclusive license agreement with GlaxoSmithKline for migalastat; GSK paid $60 million in upfront and equity payments while promising up to $170 million to help develop their products, GSK terminated the arrangement in 2013.

In November 2013, Amicus acquired competitor Callidus Biopharma for its enzyme replacement therapy treatment for Pompe disease.

In September 2015, the company acquired Scioderm for $229 million in cash and stock, with potentially $618 million more in biodollars. Scioderm had a drug in Phase III trials for epidermolysis bullosa; additionally, if the drug was approved the FDA would give its owner a priority review voucher, which itself can be sold to another company. That drug failed its Phase III trial in 2017 and Amicus abandoned it. It had paid out around half of the milestones to Scioderm's shareholders prior to closing down the program.

Also in September 2015, Amicus announced that it would submit a new drug application (NDA) for accelerated approval of migalastat to the FDA by the end of 2015. An FDA committee recommended approval in April 2016, but the FDA rejected the application in November for having insufficient data in November 2016. The drug was approved in the European Union in May 2016.

In 2016 Amicus acquired MiaMed which was working on drugs to treat CDKL5 deficiency; Amicus paid $1.8M in cash and around $4.7M in stock, with $83M in biodollars.

After Scott Gottlieb became FDA commissioner in 2017, the CEO of Amicus began lobbying him directly for the FDA to accept the NDA and in February 2018 the FDA accepted it and promised a response by August 2018.

In September 2018, Amicus announced that it had acquired Celenex, which had ten early stage gene therapies. Amicus paid $100 million upfront and could pay an additional $352 million if developmental milestones are achieved.

=== Acquisition (2025–2026) ===
In December 2025, BioMarin Pharmaceutical agreed to acquire Amicus for $4.8 billion. On April 27 2026, BioMarin Pharmaceutical completed the acquisition of Amicus Therapeutics.
