= Kutlu Ö. Ülgen =

Turkish biochemical engineer

- Born: Kutlu S. Özergin
- Education: Boğaziçi University (BS, MS); University of Manchester (PhD)
- Scientific career
- Fields: Biochemical engineering
- Workplaces: Boğaziçi University
- Thesis: Study of antibiotic synthesis by free and immobilised streptomyces coelicolor a3(2) (1992)
- Doctoral advisor: Ferda Mavituna

Kutlu Özergin Ülgen is a Turkish biochemical engineer researching pharmacophore modelling to identify pharmacological chaperones used to treat infectious diseases, genetic diseases, and cancer. Ülgen is a professor in the department of chemical engineering at Boğaziçi University.

== Education ==
Özergin completed a B.S. (1987) and M.S. (1989) in chemical engineering at Boğaziçi University. She earned a Ph.D. in chemical engineering at University of Manchester in 1992. Özergin researched Streptomyces coelicolor antibiotic production and bioreactors. Her dissertation was titled Study of antibiotic synthesis by free and immobilised streptomyces coelicolor a3(2). Özergin's doctoral advisor was Ferda Mavituna.

== Career ==
In 1992, Ülgen joined the faculty at Boğaziçi University as in instructor in the department of chemical engineering. She was promoted to assistant professor in 1994, associate professor in 1996, and professor in 2002. She served as head of the chemical engineering department from 2009 to 2011. Ülgen served as associate dean of the faculty of engineering from 2012 to December 2015.

Ülgen researches pharmacophore modelling to identify pharmacological chaperones to treat infectious diseases, genetic diseases, and cancer. She uses a systems biology approach to investigate the reconstruction of signaling networks in yeast, worms, and humans. She also researches protein purification, computational physiology, and metabolic pathway engineering.
