= CPP-115 =

Experimental drug

Legal status
- Legal status: Investigational

Identifiers
- IUPAC name: (1S,3S)-3-Amino-4-(difluoromethylidene)cyclopentane-1-carboxylic acid
- CAS Number: 640897-20-7
- PubChem CID: 9794014
- IUPHAR/BPS: 8284
- DrugBank: DB17919
- ChemSpider: 7969781
- UNII: 5TD9324Z2U
- ChEMBL: ChEMBL146927
- CompTox Dashboard (EPA): DTXSID10214277

Chemical and physical data
- Formula: C_{7}H_{9}F_{2}NO_{2}
- Molar mass: 177.151 g·mol^{−1}
- 3D model (JSmol): Interactive image
- SMILES: C1[C@H](CC(=C(F)F)[C@H]1N)C(=O)O
- InChI: InChI=1S/C7H9F2NO2/c8-6(9)4-1-3(7(11)12)2-5(4)10/h3,5H,1-2,10H2,(H,11,12)/t3-,5-/m0/s1; Key:CBSRETZPFOBWNG-UCORVYFPSA-N

CPP-115 is an experimental drug being studied for the treatment of various neurological and psychiatric disorders including cocaine addiction, infantile spasms, and Tourette syndrome.

CPP-115 is a GABA aminotransferase (GABA-AT) inactivator.

== History ==
CPP-115 was discovered in the research laboratory of Richard B. Silverman, for which he received the E. B. Hershberg Award for Important Discoveries in Medicinally Active Substances. It was licensed to Catalyst Pharmaceuticals for development in 2009.

CPP-115 has been granted orphan drug status for the treatment of infantile spasms by the FDA and for the treatment of West syndrome by the European Commission.

As of 2022, CPP-115 is in Phase II clinical trials for Tourette syndrome.

== See also ==
- List of investigational Tourette's syndrome drugs
