= Streptomyces lydicus =

Scientific classification
- Domain: Bacteria
- Kingdom: Bacillati
- Phylum: Actinomycetota
- Class: Actinomycetia
- Order: Streptomycetales
- Family: Streptomycetaceae
- Genus: Streptomyces
- Species: S. lydicus

Binomial name
- Streptomyces lydicus De Boer et al. 1956

Type strain
- AS 4.1412, ATCC 25470, BCRC 11919, CBS 703.69, CCRC 11919, CDBB 1232, CECT 3163, CEST 3163, CGMCC 4.1412, D-45, DSM 40461, DSMZ 40461, HAMBI 1063, IFO 13058, IMET 43531, ISP 5461, JCM 4492, KCC S-0492, KCCS-0492, KCTC 9874, Lanoot R-8695, LMG 19331, NBRC 13058, NCIMB 12977, NRRL 2433, NRRL B-2433, NRRL-ISP 5461, R-8695, RIA 1250, Upjohn Co. UC D-45, VKM Ac-1869

Species of bacterium

Streptomyces lydicus is a bacterium species from the genus of Streptomyces which has been isolated from soil in the United States. Streptomyces lydicus produces actithiazic acid, natamycin, lydimycin, streptolydigin, and 1-deoxygalactonojirimycin. Streptomyces lydicus can be used as an agent against fungal plant pathogens like Fusarium, Pythium, Phytophthora, Rhizoctonia and Verticillum.

== See also ==
- List of Streptomyces species
