= VBP =

VBP can refer to:

- Bokpyin Airport, Tanintharyi Region, Myanmar (IATA code: VBP)
- Civic Unity Party (Azerbaijan) (Azerbaijani: Vətəndaş Birliyi Partiyası), a former political party
- Value-based pricing, a market-driven pricing strategy based on perceived or estimated value
- Value-based purchasing, a payment model used in the healthcare sector
- Vamorolone (also known as Agamree, VBP, VBP-15 and other names), a synthetic corticosteroid
- .vbp the file name used by Visual Basic (classic)
