= Autochaperone =

In molecular biology, autotransporter proteins are proteins secreted out the Gram-negative bacteria. These beta helixes require a domain which is called the intramolecular autochaperone domain. It shows similarities with other intramolecular chaperone sequences and has a folding-associated function. This increases the efficiency, either by stabilizing the beta-barrel, or by promoting the folding of the passenger domain.

The autochaperone domain is usually located between the HSF and the passenger domain. When the passenger domain is translocated, starting with its C terminus, the autochaperone domain is first out. This would result in the formation of a hairpin structure.

== See also ==
- Pharmacological chaperone
- Protein domain
