= Scioderm =

American pharmaceutical company

- Industry: Pharmaceuticals
- Founded: April 2013
- Founders: Robert Coull, CA, CBV; Robert Ryan, Ph.D.
- Headquarters: Durham, North Carolina
- Products: SD-101 for epidermolysis bullosa (EB)
- Brands: Zorblisa

Scioderm, acquired by Amicus Therapeutics in 2015, was a rare disease company focused on developing a treatment for Epidermolysis Bullosa (EB), a rare genetic disease characterized by extremely fragile skin and recurrent blister formation. There are currently no approved therapies for EB. Scioderm was developing a topical treatment known as SD-101, or Zorblisa, aimed at triggering wound reduction and closure, and a reduction in body surface area coverage of blisters and lesions.

Epidermolysis Bullosa, sometimes referred to as "Butterfly Skin", is a rare genetic connective tissue disorder that, in all forms, results in extremely fragile skin that blisters or tears at the slightest friction or trauma. EB typically manifests at birth or early childhood. According to the Dystrophic Epidermolysis Bullosa Research Association of America (DEBRA), an estimated 1 out of every 20,000 live births are affected with some type of EB and the disorder occurs in every racial and ethnic group throughout the world and affects both sexes equally.

In Scioderm's initial open-label Phase 2 study conducted in children with either Simplex, Recessive Dystrophic (RDEB), or Junctional EB, the application of SD-101 resulted in complete closure of 88% of target chronic lesions within one month, in addition to a 57% reduction in Body Surface Area (BSA) coverage of lesions and erosions after 3 months of daily treatment.

SD-101, now owned by Amicus Therapeutics, is currently in Phase 3 clinical development to evaluate Zorblisa as a therapy for the treatment of lesions and blistering associated with Epidermolysis Bullosa. Zorblisa is the first drug to ever enter Phase 3 development for the treatment of EB. Stem cell research for Epidermolysis Bullosa is also underway by researchers at the University of Minnesota pursuant to an open-label Phase 2 trial.

In April 2013 Scioderm received Breakthrough Therapy designation from the U.S. Food and Drug Administration (FDA) for its topical treatment, SD-101 for Epidermolysis Bullosa. As a result of receiving Breakthrough therapy designation for SD-101, Scioderm was named a 2013 "Fierce Top 15" company by FierceBiotech. Prior to Scioderm's receipt of the FDA's Breakthrough therapy designation for SD-101, it had only been given to high-profile pharmaceutical companies such as Johnson & Johnson, Merck and Novartis. In addition to Breakthrough therapy designation, Scioderm received Orphan Drug Designation from both the FDA and from the European Medicines Agency (EMA) for its EB treatment.

== History ==
Scioderm was co-founded by Robert Coull and Robert Ryan. Coull and Ryan "acquired the asset from another firm, which had demonstrated a wound healing effect at a lower concentration of the active ingredient before the topical [treatment's] advancement was stalled by lack of funding." In April 2013, the company received $16 million in Series A Financing from Morgenthaler Ventures and Technology Partners.

On August 31, 2015, Amicus Therapeutics announced the acquisition of Scioderm in a deal valued at approximately $950 million based on the achievement of certain milestones. Amicus plans to complete the clinical development of SD-101 and to make the treatment commercially available for all EB patients as quickly as possible.
