= Amifampridine =

Chemical compound

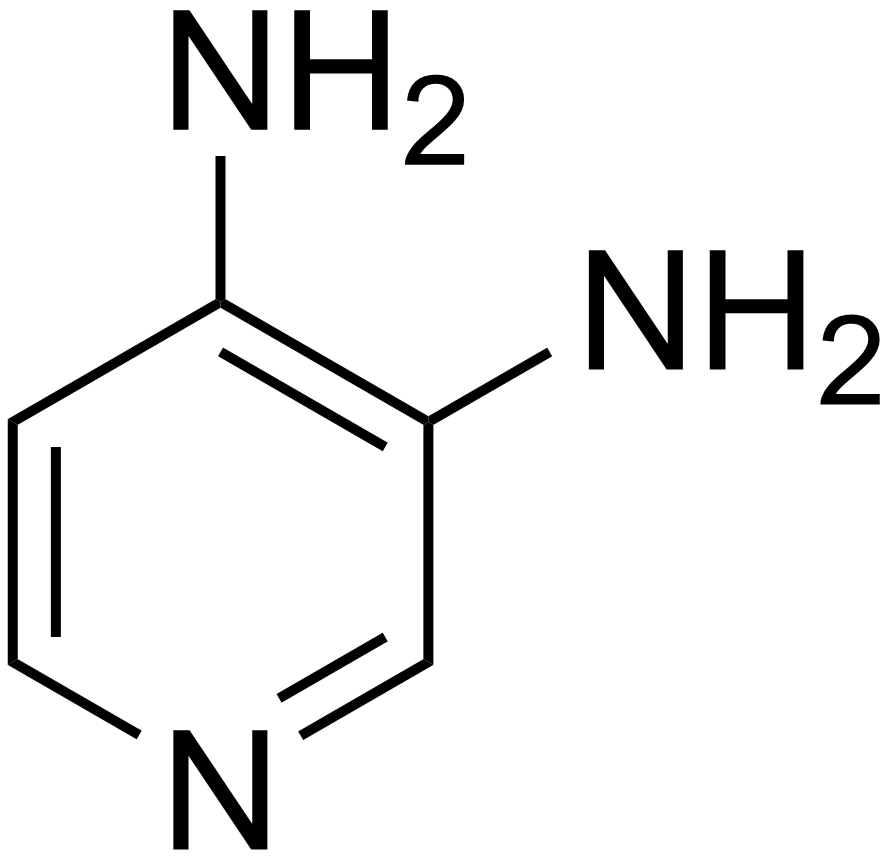

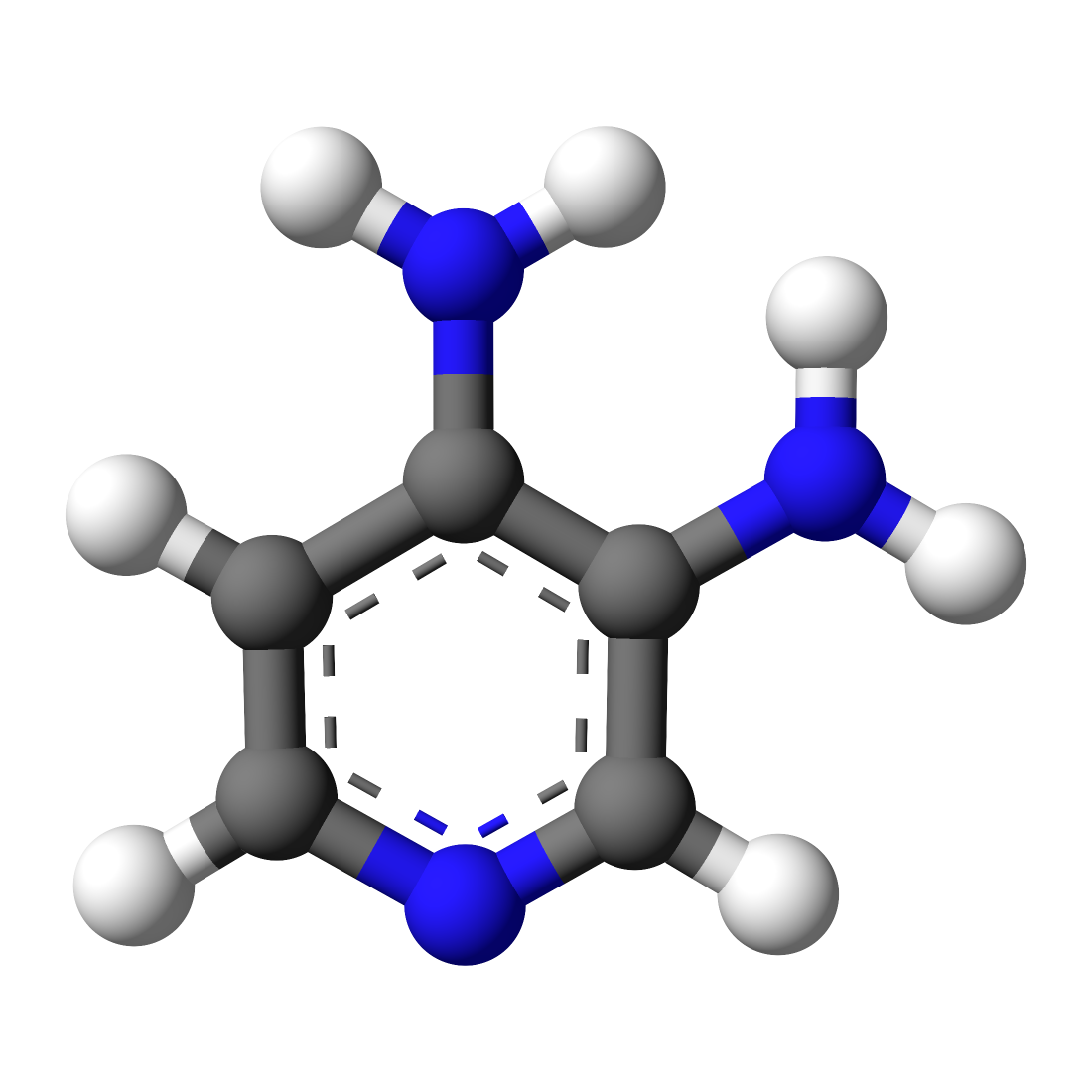

Clinical data
- Trade names: Firdapse, Ruzurgi
- Other names: pyridine-3,4-diamine, 3,4-diaminopyridine, 3,4-DAP
- AHFS/Drugs.com: Monograph
- License data: US DailyMed: Amifampridine
- Pregnancy category: AU: C
- Routes of administration: By mouth
- ATC code: N07XX05 (WHO)

Legal status
- Legal status: AU: S4 (Prescription only); CA: ℞-only; UK: POM (Prescription only); US: ℞-only; EU: Rx-only

Pharmacokinetic data
- Bioavailability: 93–100%
- Metabolism: Acetylation to 3-N-acetylamifampridine
- Elimination half-life: 2.5 hrs (amifampridine); 4 hrs (3-N-acetylamifampridine)
- Excretion: Kidney (19% unmetabolized, 74–81% 3-N-acetylamifampridine)

Identifiers
- IUPAC name: Pyridine-3,4-diamine
- CAS Number: 54-96-6; as salt: 446254-47-3
- PubChem CID: 5918
- IUPHAR/BPS: 8032
- DrugBank: DB11640; as salt: DBSALT002818
- ChemSpider: 5705; as salt: 8096351
- UNII: RU4S6E2G0J; as salt: 8HF8FIN815
- KEGG: D10228; as salt: D10689
- ChEBI: CHEBI:135948
- ChEMBL: ChEMBL354077; as salt: ChEMBL3301611
- PDB ligand: L89 (PDBe, RCSB PDB)
- CompTox Dashboard (EPA): DTXSID6046715
- ECHA InfoCard: 100.000.201

Chemical and physical data
- Formula: C_{5}H_{7}N_{3}
- Molar mass: 109.132 g·mol^{−1}
- 3D model (JSmol): Interactive image
- Melting point: 218 to 220 °C (424 to 428 °F) decomposes
- Solubility in water: 24
- SMILES: c1cncc(c1N)N
- InChI: InChI=1S/C5H7N3/c6-4-1-2-8-3-5(4)7/h1-3H,7H2,(H2,6,8); Key:OYTKINVCDFNREN-UHFFFAOYSA-N

Amifampridine phosphate is used as a drug, predominantly in the treatment of a number of rare muscle diseases. The free base form of the drug has been used to treat congenital myasthenic syndromes and approved by the FDA for Lambert–Eaton myasthenic syndrome (LEMS) through compassionate use programs since the 1990s and was recommended as a first line treatment for LEMS in 2006, using ad hoc forms of the drug, since there was no marketed form.

Around 2000 doctors at Assistance Publique – Hôpitaux de Paris created a phosphate salt form, which was developed through a series of companies ending with BioMarin Pharmaceutical which obtained European approval in 2009 under the brand name Firdapse, and which licensed the US rights to Catalyst Pharmaceuticals in 2012. As of January 2017, Catalyst and another US company, Jacobus Pharmaceutical, which had been manufacturing and giving it away for free since the 1990s, were both seeking FDA approval for their iterations and marketing rights.

Amifampridine phosphate (Firdapse) has orphan drug status in the EU for Lambert–Eaton myasthenic syndrome and Catalyst holds both an orphan designation and a breakthrough therapy designation in the US. In May 2019, the US Food and Drug Administration (FDA) approved amifampridine tablets under the brand name Ruzurgi for the treatment of Lambert-Eaton myasthenic syndrome (LEMS) in people 6 to less than 17 years of age. Ruzurgi is no longer available in the United States. As of November 2018, the only other treatment approved by the FDA for LEMS (Firdapse) was only approved for use in adults. In 2022, Firdapse approval was expanded to include pediatric patients 6 years of age or older. In 2024, the FDA approved a supplemental New Drug Application increasing the maximum daily dose of Firdapse (amifampridine) for adults and pediatric patients weighing more than 45 kg from 80 mg to 100 mg.

== Medical uses ==
Amifampridine is used to treat many of the congenital myasthenic syndromes, particularly those with defects in choline acetyltransferase, downstream kinase 7, and those where any kind of defect causes "fast channel" behaviour of the acetylcholine receptor. However, it failed clinical trials. It is also used to treat symptoms of Lambert–Eaton myasthenic syndrome.

== Contraindications ==
Because it affects voltage-gated ion channels in the heart, it is contraindicated in people with long QT syndrome and in people taking a drug that might prolong QT time like sultopride, disopyramide, cisapride, domperidone, rifampicin or ketoconazol. It is also contraindicated in people with epilepsy or badly controlled asthma.

== Adverse effects ==
The dose-limiting side effects include tingling or numbness, difficulty sleeping, fatigue, and loss of muscle strength.

Seizures have been observed in patients without a history of seizures.

== Interactions ==
The combination of amifampridine with pharmaceuticals that prolong QT time increases the risk of ventricular tachycardia, especially torsade de pointes; and combination with drugs that lower the seizure threshold increases the risk of seizures. Interactions via the liver's cytochrome P450 enzyme system are considered unlikely.

== Pharmacology ==
=== Mechanism of action ===
In Lambert–Eaton myasthenic syndrome, acetylcholine release is inhibited as antibodies involved in the host response against certain cancers cross-react with Ca^{2+} channels on the prejunctional membrane. Amifampridine works by blocking potassium channel efflux in nerve terminals so that action potential duration is increased. Ca^{2+} channels can then be open for a longer time and allow greater acetylcholine release to stimulate muscle at the end plate.

=== Pharmacokinetics ===
N-(4-Amino-3-pyridinyl)acetamide or 3-N-acetylamifampridine, the metabolite

Amifampridine is quickly and almost completely (93–100%) absorbed from the gut. In a study with 91 healthy subjects, maximum amifampridine concentrations in blood plasma were reached after 0.6 (±0.25) hours when taken without food, or after 1.3 (±0.9) hours after a fatty meal, meaning that the speed of absorption varies widely. Biological half-life (2.5±0.7 hrs) and the area under the curve (AUC = 117±77 ng∙h/ml) also vary widely between subjects, but are nearly independent of food intake.

The substance is deactivated by acetylation via N-acetyltransferases to the single metabolite 3-N-acetylamifampridine. Activity of these enzymes (primarily N-acetyltransferase 2) in different individuals seems to be primarily responsible for the mentioned differences in half-life and AUC: the latter is increased up to 9-fold in slow metabolizers as compared to fast metabolizers.

Amifampridine is eliminated via the kidneys and urine to 74–81% as N-acetylamifampridine and to 19% in unchanged form.

== Chemistry ==
3,4-Diaminopyridine is yellow solid, although commercial samples often appear brownish. It melts at about 218–220 °C (424–428 °F) with decomposition. Its density of 1.404 g/cm^{3}. It is readily soluble in alcohols and hot water, but only slightly in diethyl ether. Solubility in water at 20 °C (68 °F) is 25 g/L.

The drug formulation amifampridine phosphate contains the phosphate salt, more specifically 4-aminopyridine-3-ylammonium dihydrogen phosphate. This salt forms prismatic, monoclinic crystals (space group C2/c) and is readily soluble in water. The phosphate salt is stable, and does not require refrigeration.

== History ==
The development of amifampridine and its phosphate has brought attention to orphan drug policies that grant market exclusivity as an incentive for companies to develop therapies for conditions that affect small numbers of people.

Amifampridine, also called 3,4-DAP, was discovered in Scotland in the 1970s, and doctors in Sweden first showed its use in LEMS in the 1980s.

In the 1990s, doctors in the US, on behalf of Muscular Dystrophy Association, approached a small family-owned manufacturer of active pharmaceutical ingredients in New Jersey, Jacobus Pharmaceuticals, about manufacturing amifampridine so they could test it in clinical trials. Jacobus did so, and when the treatment turned out to be effective, Jacobus and the doctors were faced with a choice — invest in clinical trials to get FDA approval or give the drug away for free under a compassionate use program to about 200 patients out of the estimated 1500-3000 LEMS patients in the U.S.. Jacobus elected to give the drug away to this subset of LEMS patients, and did so for about twenty years.

Doctors at the Assistance Publique – Hôpitaux de Paris had created a phosphate salt of 3,4-DAP (3,4-DAPP), and obtained an orphan designation for it in Europe in 2002. The hospital licensed the intellectual property on the phosphate form to the French biopharma company OPI, which was acquired by EUSA Pharma in 2007, and the orphan application was transferred to EUSA in 2008. In 2008 EUSA submitted an application for approval to market the phosphate form to the European Medicines Agency under the brand name Zenas. EUSA, through a vehicle called Huxley Pharmaceuticals, sold the rights to 3,4-DAPP to BioMarin in 2009, the same year that 3,4-DAPP was approved in Europe under the new name Firdapse.

The licensing of Firdapse in 2010 in Europe led to a sharp increase in price for the drug. In some cases, this has led to hospitals using an unlicensed form rather than the licensed agent, as the price difference proved prohibitive. BioMarin has been criticized for licensing the drug on the basis of previously conducted research, and yet charging exorbitantly for it. A group of UK neurologists and pediatricians petitioned to prime minister David Cameron in an open letter to review the situation. The company responded that it submitted the licensing request at the suggestion of the French government, and points out that the increased cost of a licensed drug also means that it is monitored by regulatory authorities (e.g. for uncommon side effects), a process that was previously not present in Europe. A 2011 Cochrane review compared the cost of the 3,4-DAP and 3,4-DAPP in the UK and found an average price for 3,4-DAP base of £1/tablet and an average price for 3,4-DAP phosphate of £20/tablet; and the authors estimated a yearly cost per person of £730 for the base versus £29,448 for the phosphate formulation.

Meanwhile, in Europe, a task force of neurologists had recommended 3,4-DAP as the firstline treatment for LEMS symptoms in 2006, even though there was no approved form for marketing; it was being supplied ad hoc. In 2007 the drug's international nonproprietary name was published by the WHO.

In the face of the seven-year exclusivity that an orphan approval would give to Biomarin, and of the increase in price that would accompany it, Jacobus began racing to conduct formal clinical trials in order to get approval for the free base form before BioMarin; its first Phase II trial was opened in January 2012.

In October 2012, while BioMarin had a Phase III trial ongoing in the US, it licensed the US rights to 3,4-DAPP, including the orphan designation and the ongoing trial, to Catalyst Pharmaceuticals. Catalyst anticipated that it could earn $300 to $900 million per year in sales at peak sales for treatment of people with LEMS and other indications, and analysts anticipated the drug would be priced at around. $100,000 in the US. Catalyst went on to obtain a breakthrough therapy designation for 3,4-DAPP in LEMS in 2013, an orphan designation for congenital myasthenic syndromes in 2015 and an orphan designation for myasthenia gravis in 2016.

In August 2013, analysts anticipated that FDA approval would be granted to Catalyst in LEMS by 2015.

In October 2014, Catalyst began making available under an expanded access program.

In March 2015, Catalyst obtained an orphan designation for the use of 3,4-DAPP to treat of congenital myasthenic syndrome. In April 2015, Jacobus presented clinical trial results with 3,4-DAP at a scientific meeting.

In December 2015, a group of 106 neuromuscular doctors who had worked with both Jacobus and BioMarin/Catalyst published an editorial in the journal, Muscle & Nerve, expressing concern about the potential for the price of the drug to be dramatically increased should Catalyst obtain FDA approval, and stating that 3,4-DAPP represented no real innovation and didn't deserve exclusivity under the Orphan Drug Act, which was meant to spur innovation to meet unmet needs. Catalyst responded to this editorial with a response in 2016 that explained that Catalyst was conducting a full range of clinical and non-clinical studies necessary to obtain approval in order to specifically address the unmet need among the estimated 1500-3000 LEMs patients since about 200 were receiving the product through compassionate use – and that this is exactly what the Orphan Drug Act was intended to do: deliver approved products to orphan drug populations so that all patients have full access.

In December 2015, Catalyst submitted its new drug application to the FDA, and in February 2016 the FDA refused to accept it, on the basis that it wasn't complete. In April 2016 the FDA told Catalyst it would have to gather further data. Catalyst cut 30% of its workforce, mainly from the commercial team it was building to support an approved product, to save money to conduct the trials. In March 2018 the company re-submitted its NDA. The FDA approved amifampridine for the treatment of adults with Lambert-Eaton myasthenic syndrome on November 29, 2018.

In February 2019, US Senator Bernie Sanders questioned the high price ($375,000) charged by Catalyst Pharmaceuticals for Firdapse.

In May 2019, the privately held US company Jacobus Pharmaceutical, Princeton, New Jersey gained approval by the FDA for amifampridine tablets (Ruzurgi) for the treatment of LEMS in patients 6 to less than 17 years of age. This is the first FDA approval of a treatment specifically for pediatric patients with LEMS. Firdapse is only approved for use in adults. Although Ruzurgi has been approved for pediatric patients, this approval makes it possible for adults with LEMS to get the drug off-label. Jacobus Pharmaceutical had been manufacturing and giving it away for free since the 1990s. The FDA decision dropped the stock of Catalyst Pharmaceuticals. The company's stock price has dropped about 50%.

On January 28, 2022, in Catalyst Pharmaceuticals, Inc. v. Becerra, the Eleventh Circuit upheld orphan exclusivity for Catalyst Pharmaceuticals and its drug Firdapse. With this decision, the Eleventh Circuit rejected the FDA's interpretation of orphan exclusivity and concluded that the agency had improperly approved a competitor product from Jacobus Pharmaceutical.

In October 2022, Firdapse approval was expanded to include pediatric patients 6 years of age or older.

In May 2024, the FDA approved a supplemental New Drug Application increasing the indicated maximum daily dose of Firdapse (amifampridine) for adults and pediatric patients weighing more than 45 kg from 80 mg to 100 mg.

== Research ==
Amifampridine has also been proposed for the treatment of multiple sclerosis (MS). A 2002 Cochrane systematic review found that there was no unbiased data to support its use for treating MS. There was no change as of 2012.

Isomazole is a drug that is made from an amifampridine precursor.
