= Prosensa =

Dutch biotechnology company

Prosensa Therapeutics
- Company type: Public
- Traded as: Nasdaq: RNA
- Industry: Biotechnology
- Founded: 2002
- Headquarters: Leiden, Netherlands
- Key people: Hans Schikan (CEO), Berndt Modig (CFO), Giles Champion (CMO), Luc Dochez (CBO) David Mott (Chairman)
- Products: Pharmaceuticals
- Number of employees: 89 (2014)
- Website: www.prosensa.com

Prosensa was a biotechnology company engaged in the discovery, development and commercialization of RNA-modulating therapeutics. The company targets genetic disorders with a large unmet medical need, with a primary focus on neuromuscular and neurodegenerative disorders such as Duchenne muscular dystrophy (DMD), myotonic dystrophy, and Huntington's disease. Prosensa was acquired by BioMarin.

== History up to the sale ==
Prosensa commenced operations in 2002 and is located in Leiden, The Netherlands. The company works closely together with academia, patient groups and experts worldwide. Prosensa entered into an exclusive licensing agreement in 2003 with Leiden University Medical Center (LUMC) for their proprietary RNA modulation exon-skipping technology to develop treatments for DMD, other neuromuscular disorders and indications outside the field of neuromuscular disorders.

Prosensa's portfolio of clinical and pre-clinical RNA-based drug candidates is currently focused on the treatment of DMD.

Prosensa's lead product, drisapersen, has completed Phase III clinical trials and (in June 2015) a New Drug Application (NDA) has been accepted by the US FDA.

Three additional products, PRO044, PRO045 and PRO053 were also in clinical development, and PRO052 and PRO055 were in advanced preclinical development. In parallel, Prosensa also had an advanced program called PROSPECT into pre-clinical testing, which included a new and innovative application of its exon-skipping technology platform, applying multiple exon skipping, to specifically target rarer mutations (initially in exon 10 to 30 region) in the dystrophin gene. This approach could have applicability between 5-13% of the DMD population.

In addition to its clinical trials, Prosensa were running a Natural History Study, which has completed enrollment with 269 patients across the US, Europe and Latin America. The purpose of this study was to characterize the natural history and progression of DMD, to help inform the design of future studies, to capture biomarkers of safety and disease progression and to provide comparative data for the development of rare exons for which formal controlled trials are not feasible.

An American shareholder filed a class action against Prosensa in New York court in 2014, alleging that he felt misled in the June 2013 NASDAQ IPO. His assumption was, that Prosensa would have developed a drug against Duchenne disease and would receive royalties for it in the short term. However, three months later it would have been revealed that the drug did not really work, resulting in a sharp drop in its share price.

In November 2014, BioMarin Pharmaceutical agreed to pay up to $840 million to acquire Prosensa.

== Related events since the sale ==
In January 2016, the FDA rejected drisapersen, largely on the basis of toxicity.

In May 2016, BioMarin discontinued the clinical and regulatory development of drisapersen, as well as phase 2 studies of BMN 044, BMN 045 and BMN 053 (formerly PRO044, PRO045 and PRO053).
