= Franz N. D. Kurie =

American nuclear physicist (1907–1972)

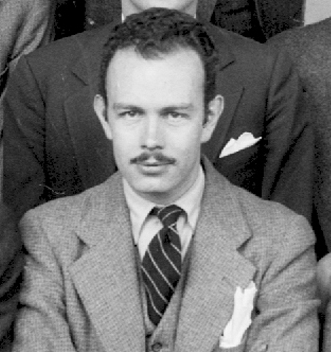
- Kurie in 1938
- Born: Franz Newell Devereux Kurie; February 6, 1907; Victor, Colorado, U.S.
- Died: June 12, 1972 (aged 65)
- Education: McGill University (B.Sc.); Yale University (Ph.D.)
- Known for: Kurie plot
- Spouse: Dorothy Gede
- Awards: President's Certificate of Merit; Navy Distinguished Civilian Service Award
- Scientific career
- Workplaces: Yale University; University of California, Berkeley; Indiana University Bloomington; Washington University in St. Louis; Naval Research Laboratory; Navy Electronics Laboratory

Franz Newell Devereux Kurie (/ˈkʌri/; February 6, 1907 in Victor, Colorado – June 12, 1972) was an American physicist who, while working at Yale University in 1933, showed that the neutron was neither a dumbbell-shaped combination of proton and electron, nor an onion-shaped combination of an electron embracing the proton. Consequently, and until the discovery of the quark structure of hadrons, the neutron was assumed to be an elementary particle.

His Kurie plot is used in the study of beta decay.

Kurie earned his B.Sc. at McGill University in Montreal, Quebec, Canada, in 1927 and his Ph.D. at Yale University in 1932. He then worked with Ernest Lawrence at the new Radiation Laboratory in Berkeley, California before taking up an assistant professorship at Indiana University Bloomington. He spent World War II working at the US Navy Radio and Sound Laboratory in San Diego, and after holding postwar positions at Washington University in St. Louis and the Naval Research Laboratory in Washington, DC, he returned to San Diego as technical director of what had by then been renamed the US Navy Electronics Laboratory. He continued to head the San Diego laboratory until he was debilitated by a serious stroke in 1960.

Kurie was awarded the President's Certificate of Merit for his wartime work, and was given the Navy Distinguished Civilian Service Award in 1961.
