= Richard Bruce Silverman =

American chemist

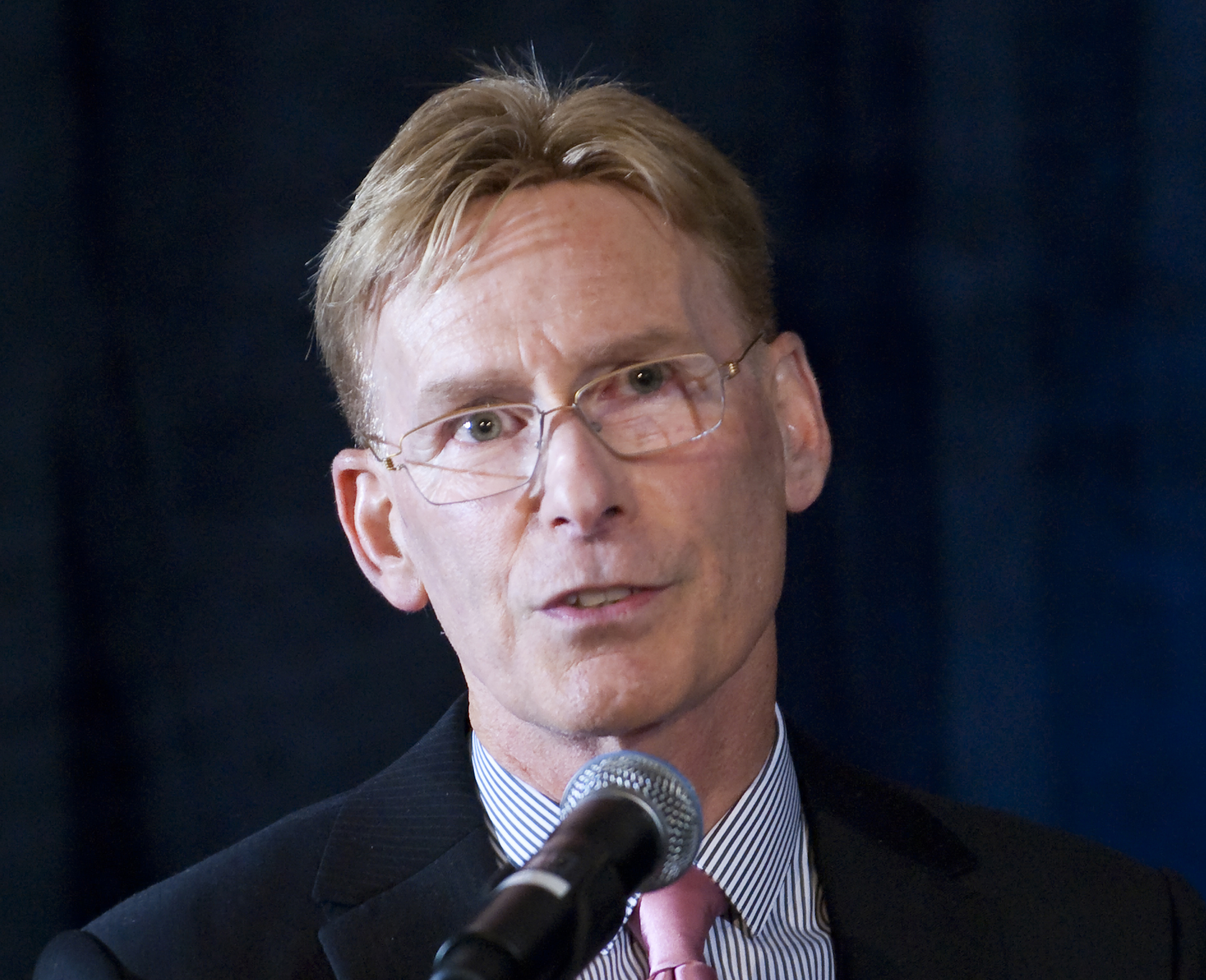
- Richard Silverman, Perkin Award, 2009
- Born: May 12, 1946 (age 80); Philadelphia, PA
- Education: Pennsylvania State University (B.S.); Harvard University (Ph.D.)
- Known for: Pregabalin (brand name Lyrica)
- Awards: Perkin Medal (2009); Fellow, ACS (2011); Centenary Prize (2013); Fellow, RSC (2013); Fellow, AAAS (2014); Fellow, NAI (2014); Tetrahedron Prize (2021); Member, NAS (2023); Abeles and Jencks Award in Chemistry of Biological Processes (2024); Esselen Award for Chemistry in the Public Interest (2024)
- Scientific career
- Fields: Chemistry
- Workplaces: Northwestern University
- Doctoral advisor: David Dolphin

External videos
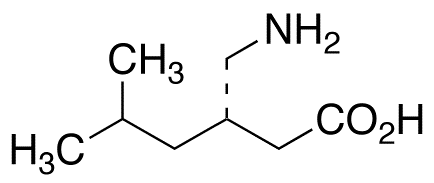
- "Richard B. Silverman, Basic Science to Blockbuster Drug", National Academy of Inventors

Richard Bruce Silverman (born May 12, 1946) is the Patrick G. Ryan/Aon Professor of Chemistry at Northwestern University. His group's main focus is basic and translational research into central nervous system disorders and cancer. He is known for the discovery of pregabalin, which is marketed by Pfizer under the brand name Lyrica.

== Education ==
Silverman attended Central High School of Philadelphia. Silverman received his B.S. in chemistry from Pennsylvania State University in 1968. He spent one semester at Harvard University before being drafted and serving as a United States Army Physical Sciences Assistant at the Walter Reed Army Institute of Research from January 1969 until his honorable discharge in January 1971. In June 1974, he received his Ph.D. from Harvard University in organic chemistry with advisor David Dolphin. He then spent two years as a postdoctoral fellow with Robert Abeles in biochemistry at Brandeis University.

== Research ==
Silverman has been teaching and doing research at Northwestern since 1976. He became both professor of chemistry and professor of biochemistry, molecular biology, and cell biology in 1986. He has held several named professorships. He was the Arthur Andersen Professor of Chemistry from 1988 to 1996, the Charles Deering McCormick Professor of Teaching Excellence from 2001 to 2003, and the John Evans Professor of Chemistry beginning from 2004 to 2015. He was named the inaugural Patrick G. Ryan/Aon Professor as of September 1, 2015.

The primary focus in Silverman's laboratory is basic research into central nervous system disorders, including Amyotrophic lateral sclerosis (ALS), Parkinson's disease, Alzheimer's disease, and epilepsy. Other research areas include cancer (melanoma and hepatocellular carcinoma). He has developed novel approaches to the elucidation of enzyme-catalyzed reactions in organic chemistry. He is interested in understanding and developing mechanisms of enzyme inhibition.

Silverman has published about 400 research articles. He has been awarded 130 patents. He has written 3 books (one in the third edition): Mechanism-Based Enzyme Inactivation: Chemistry and Enzymology (CRC Press; 1988), Organic Chemistry of Drug Design and Drug Action (Academic Press; 1992, 2004, 2014), and Organic Chemistry of Enzyme-Catalyzed Reactions (Academic Press; 2000, 2002; see the Published works section, below). He is active on the editorial boards of a number of scholarly journals.

Silverman is known for inventing the drug pregabalin as a possible treatment for epileptic seizures. During 1988-1990, Ryszard Andruszkiewicz, a visiting research fellow, synthesized a series of molecules for Silverman. One looked promising. The molecule was transported into the brain, where it activated the enzyme L-glutamate decarboxylase. Silverman anticipated that the enzyme would increase production of the inhibitory neurotransmitter GABA and block convulsions. Eventually, the set of molecules were sent to Parke-Davis Pharmaceuticals for testing. In addition to treating seizures, pregabalin was found to be effective in treating fibromyalgia pain, neuropathic pain, and generalized anxiety disorder. It was approved by the FDA in 2004 and marketed by Pfizer (which bought Parke-Davis) under the trade name Lyrica.

Research has shown that the mechanism of the drug is more complicated than originally anticipated. In addition to its effects on GABA-AT substrate behavior, pregabalin binds to calcium channels and blocks glutamate release. GABA is potentiated, but through a different mechanism than originally suspected.

== Awards and honors ==
=== Memberships ===
- 1985 Fellow of the American Institute of Chemists
- 1990 Fellow of the American Association for the Advancement of Science
- 2011 Fellow of the American Chemical Society
- 2013 Fellow of the Royal Society of Chemistry
- 2014 Fellow of the National Academy of Inventors
- 2014 Elected to the American Academy of Arts & Sciences
- 2023 Elected to the National Academy of Sciences

=== Medals, Prizes ===
- 1976 DuPont Young Faculty Fellow
- 1981 Alfred P. Sloan Foundation Fellow
- 1982-1987 National Institutes of Health Research Career Development award
- 2003 Arthur C. Cope Scholar Award of the American Chemical Society
- 2008 Alumni Fellow Award from the Pennsylvania State University
- 2009 Perkin Medal from the American section of the Society of Chemical Industry
- 2009 inductee into the Medicinal Chemistry Hall of Fame of the American Chemical Society
- 2011 inductee into the Alumni Hall of Fame of Central High School of Philadelphia
- 2011 E.B. Hershberg Award for important discoveries in medicinally active substances from the American Chemical Society for the discovery of CPP-115
- 2012 Sato Memorial International Award of the Pharmaceutical Society of Japan
- 2013 Roland T. Lakey Award from Wayne State University
- 2013 Centenary Prize of the Royal Society of Chemistry
- 2013 Bristol-Myers Squibb-Edward E. Smissman Award of the American Chemical Society
- 2014 Excellence in Medicinal Chemistry Prize, Israel Chemical Society
- 2014 first recipient of the Northwestern University Trustee Medal for Faculty Innovation and Entrepreneurship
- 2014 iCON Innovator Award of the iBIO Institute
- 2017 Award for Creative Invention, American Chemical Society
- 2017 Distinguished Alumnus Award, Pennsylvania State University
- 2021 Tetrahedron Prize for Creativity in Bioorganic and Medicinal Chemistry
- 2024 Esselen Award for Chemistry in the Public Interest, American Chemical Society
- 2024 Abeles and Jencks Award for Chemistry of Biological Processes, American Chemical Society

=== Teaching awards ===
Silverman has received numerous teaching awards from Northwestern University, including the following:

- 1999 E. LeRoy Hall Award for Teaching Excellence
- 1999 Excellence in Chemistry Education Award from the Northwestern University chapter of Alpha Chi Sigma Chemistry Fraternity
- 2000 Alumni Association Excellence in Teaching Award
- 2001-2004 Charles Deering McCormick Professor of Teaching Excellence

== Philanthropy ==
Lyrica royalties paid to Northwestern, and a gift from Silverman himself, have supported the Silverman Hall for Molecular Therapeutics and Diagnostics at Northwestern University. Silverman Hall, which opened in 2009, was designed to be a collaborative and interdisciplinary facility housing researchers from chemistry, biology, and engineering.

== Published works ==
=== Books ===
- Silverman, Richard B. (1988) [1988]. Mechanism-Based Enzyme Inactivation: Chemistry and Enzymology (1st ed.). Boca Raton, Fl.: CRC Press. ISBN 978-0849345432.
- Silverman, Richard B. (2002) [2000]. The Organic Chemistry of Enzyme-Catalyzed Reactions (2nd ed.). San Diego, Calif.: Academic Press. ISBN 0126437319.
- Silverman, Richard B. (2000) [2000]. The Organic Chemistry of Enzyme-Catalyzed Reactions (1st ed.). San Diego, Calif.: Academic Press. ISBN 0126437459.
- Silverman, Richard B.; Holladay, Mark W. (2014) [1992]. The Organic Chemistry of Drug Design and Drug Action (3rd ed.). San Diego, Calif.: Elsevier Science. ISBN 978-0123820303.
- Silverman, Richard B. (2004) [1992]. The Organic Chemistry of Drug Design and Drug Action (2nd ed.). San Diego, Calif.: Elsevier/Academic Press. ISBN 0126437327.
- Silverman, Richard B. (1992) [1992]. The Organic Chemistry of Drug Design and Drug Action (1st ed.). San Diego, Calif.: Academic Press. ISBN 0126437300.
