= Migalastat =

Chemical compound

Clinical data
- Pronunciation: mi GAL a stat
- Trade names: Galafold
- Other names: DDIG, AT1001, 1-deoxygalactonojirimycin
- AHFS/Drugs.com: Monograph
- MedlinePlus: a625101
- License data: US DailyMed: Migalastat
- Pregnancy category: AU: B3
- Routes of administration: By mouth
- Drug class: Pharmacological chaperone
- ATC code: A16AX14 (WHO)

Legal status
- Legal status: AU: S4 (Prescription only); CA: ℞-only; US: ℞-only; EU: Rx-only; JP: Rx-only

Pharmacokinetic data
- Bioavailability: 75%
- Protein binding: None
- Metabolites: O-glucuronides (<15%)
- Elimination half-life: 3–5 hours (single dose)
- Excretion: Urine (77%), feces (20%)

Identifiers
- IUPAC name: (2R,3S,4R,5S)-2-(Hydroxymethyl)-3,4,5-piperidinetriol
- CAS Number: 108147-54-2; HCl: 75172-81-5
- PubChem CID: 176077; HCl: 11644097
- DrugBank: DB05018; HCl: DBSALT000828
- ChemSpider: 153388; HCl: 9818836
- UNII: C4XNY919FW; HCl: CLY7M0XD20
- KEGG: D10359; HCl: D05031
- ChEMBL: ChEMBL110458; HCl: ChEMBL2107355
- CompTox Dashboard (EPA): DTXSID201022520

Chemical and physical data
- Formula: C_{6}H_{13}NO_{4}
- Molar mass: 163.173 g·mol^{−1}
- 3D model (JSmol): Interactive image; HCl: Interactive image
- SMILES: C1[C@@H]([C@H]([C@H]([C@H](N1)CO)O)O)O; HCl: Cl.OC[C@H]1NC[C@H](O)[C@@H](O)[C@H]1O
- InChI: InChI=1S/C6H13NO4/c8-2-3-5(10)6(11)4(9)1-7-3/h3-11H,1-2H2/t3-,4+,5+,6-/m1/s1; Key:LXBIFEVIBLOUGU-DPYQTVNSSA-N; HCl: InChI=1S/C6H13NO4.ClH/c8-2-3-5(10)6(11)4(9)1-7-3;/h3-11H,1-2H2;1H/t3-,4+,5+,6-;/m1./s1; Key:ZJIHMALTJRDNQI-OLALXQGDSA-N

Migalastat, sold under the brand name Galafold, is a medication used for the treatment of Fabry disease, a rare genetic disorder. Migalastat is an alpha-galactosidase A (alpha-Gal A) pharmacological chaperone. It was developed by Amicus Therapeutics.

The most common adverse drug reactions include headache, nasal and throat irritation (nasopharyngitis), urinary tract infection, nausea, and fever.

Migalastat was authorized for medical use in the European Union in May 2016, and approved for medical use in the United States in August 2018. The US Food and Drug Administration considers it to be a first-in-class medication.

== Medical uses ==
In the EU, migalastat is indicated for the long-term treatment of people aged 16 years of age and older with a confirmed diagnosis of Fabry disease (alpha-galactosidase A deficiency) and who have an amenable mutation.

In the US, migalastat is indicated for the treatment of adults with a confirmed diagnosis of Fabry disease and an amenable galactosidase alpha gene (GLA) variant based on in vitro assay data.

An "amenable" mutation is one that leads to misfolding of the enzyme, but otherwise would not significantly impair its function.

Based on an in vitro test, Amicus Therapeutics has published a list of 269 amenable and nearly 600 non-amenable mutations. About 35–50% of people with Fabry disease have an amenable mutation.

== Adverse effects ==
The most common adverse drug reactions include headache, nasal and throat irritation (nasopharyngitis), urinary tract infection, nausea, and fever (pyrexia).

The most common side effect in clinical trials was headache (in about 10% of people who take it). Less common side effects (between 1 and 10% of people) included unspecific symptoms such as dizziness, fatigue, and nausea, but also depression. Possible rare side effects could not be assessed because of the low number of subjects in the clinical trials in which adverse effects were measured.

== Interactions ==
When combined with intravenous agalsidase alfa or beta, which are recombinant versions of the enzyme α-GalA, migalastat increases tissue concentrations of functional α-GalA compared to agalsidase given alone up to fivefold.Migalastat is not intended to be combined with agalsidase.

Migalastat does not inhibit or induce cytochrome P450 liver enzymes or transporter proteins and is therefore expected to have a low potential for interactions with other drugs.

== Pharmacology ==
=== Mechanism of action ===
Fabry disease is a genetic disorder caused by various mutations of the enzyme α-GalA, which is responsible for breaking down the sphingolipid globotriaosylceramide (Gb3), among other glycolipids and glycoproteins. Some of these mutations result in misfolding of α-GalA, which subsequently fails protein quality control in the endoplasmic reticulum and is decomposed. Lack of functional α-GalA leads to accumulation of Gb3 in blood vessels and other tissues, with a wide range of symptoms including kidney, heart, and skin problems.

Migalastat is a potent, orally available inhibitor of α-GalA (IC_{50}: 4 μM). When binding to faulty α-GalA, it shifts the folding behaviour towards the proper conformation, resulting in a functional enzyme provided the mutation is amenable. Molecules with this type of mechanism are called pharmacological chaperones.

When the enzyme reaches its destination, the lysosome, migalastat dissociates because of the low pH and the relative abundance of Gb3 and other substrates, leaving α-GalA free to fulfill its function. Depending on the mutation, the EC_{50} is between 0.8 μM and over 1 mM in cellular models.

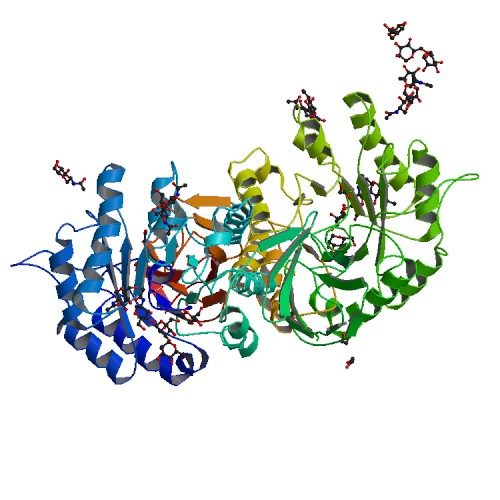
The enzyme alpha-galactosidase A (α-GalA)

Globotriaosylceramide (Gb3), a substrate of α-GalA, has a terminal D-galactose structurally similar to migalastat.

Migalastat ("top" view)

=== Pharmacokinetics ===
Migalastat is almost completely absorbed from the gut; taking the drug together with food decreases its absorption by about 40%. Total bioavailability is about 75% when taken without food. The substance is not bound to blood plasma proteins.

Only a small fraction of a migalastat dose is metabolized, mainly to three dehydrogenated O-glucuronides (4% of the dose) and a number of unspecified metabolites (10%). The drug is mainly eliminated via the urine (77%) and to a smaller extent via the faeces (20%). Practically all of the metabolites are excreted in the urine. Elimination half-life is three to five hours after a single dose.

== Chemistry ==
D-Galactose, for comparison

Migalastat is used in form of the hydrochloride, which is a white crystalline solid and is soluble in water. The molecule has four asymmetric carbon atoms with the same stereochemistry as the sugar D-galactose, but is missing the first hydroxyl group. It has a nitrogen atom in the ring instead of an oxygen, which makes it an iminosugar.

== History ==
Migalastat was isolated as a fermentation product of the bacterium Streptomyces lydicus (strain PA-5726) in 1988 and called 1-deoxygalactonojirimycin. In 2004, it was designated orphan drug status by the U.S. FDA for the treatment of Fabry disease, as did the European Medicines Agency's CHMP in 2006. The sponsorship for the drug was transferred several times over the following years: from Amicus Therapeutics to Shire Pharmaceuticals in 2008, back to Amicus in 2010, to Glaxo in 2011, and again to Amicus in 2014.

Two phase III clinical trials with a total of about 110 subjects were conducted between 2009 and 2015, one double-blind comparing the drug to placebo, and one comparing it to recombinant α-GalA without blinding. Migalastat stabilised heart and kidney function over the 30-months period of these trials.

The efficacy of migalastat was demonstrated in a six-month, placebo-controlled clinical trial in 45 adults with Fabry disease. In this trial, participants treated with migalastat over six months had a greater reduction in globotriaosylceramide (GL-3) in blood vessels of the kidneys (as measured in kidney biopsy samples) as compared to participants on placebo. The safety of migalastat was studied in four clinical trials which included a total of 139 participants with Fabry disease.

In September 2015, Amicus announced that it would submit a new drug application (NDA) for accelerated approval of migalastat to the FDA by the end of 2015. The CHMP recommended approval in April 2016, but the FDA rejected the application in November for having insufficient data in November 2016. The drug was authorized in the European Union in May 2016. Germany was the first country where migalastat was launched.

== Society and culture ==
=== Legal status ===
Migalastat was authorized for medical use in the European Union in May 2016, and approved for medical use in the United States in August 2018. The FDA granted approval of Galafold to Amicus Therapeutics U.S., Inc.

The US Food and Drug Administration (FDA) granted the application for migalastat priority review and orphan drug designations. The European Medicines Agency granted it orphan drug designation in 2006.
