= President's Certificate of Merit =

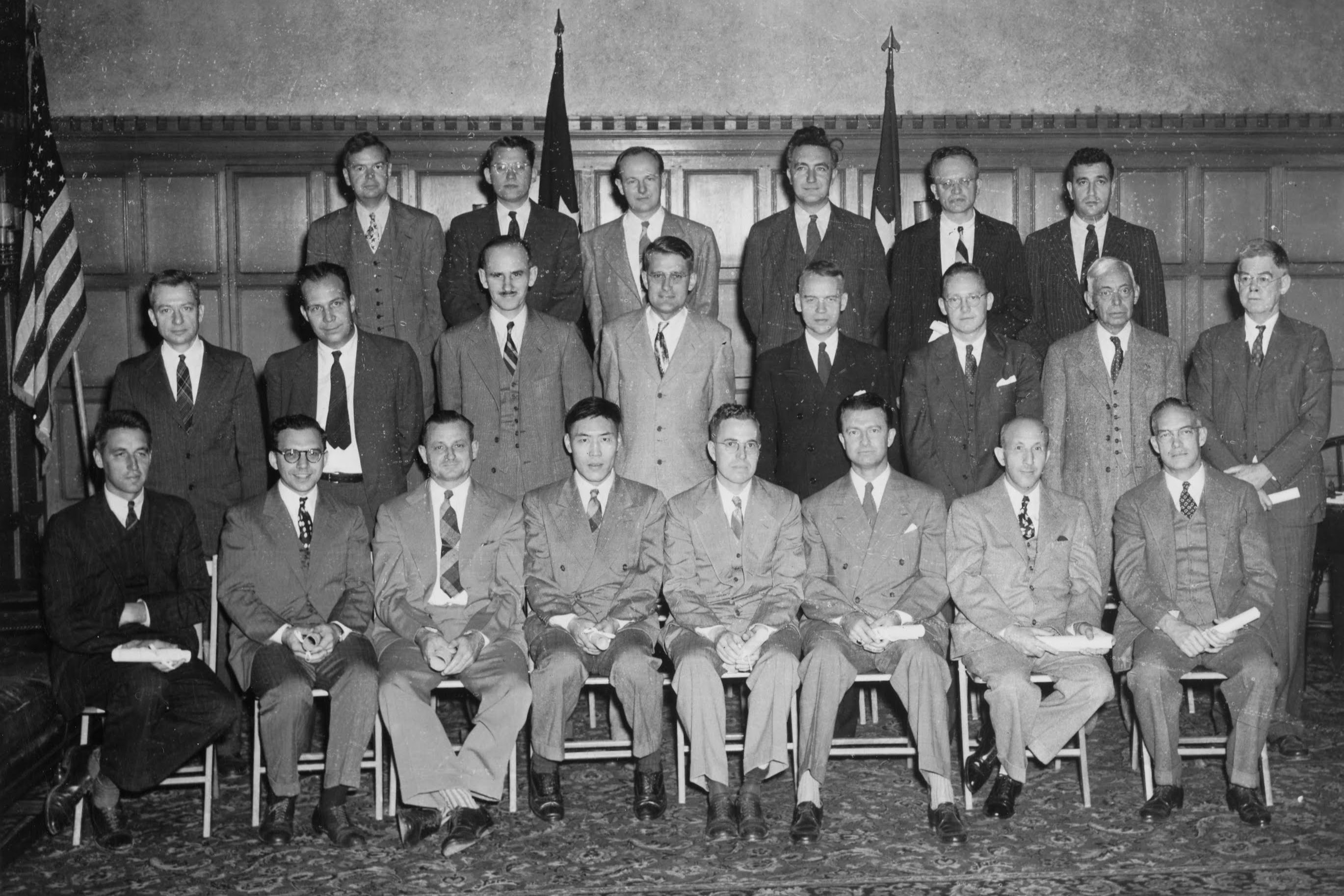
Certificate of Merit awardees at MIT, October 1948.

The President's Certificate of Merit was created June 6, 1946 by Executive Order 9734 signed by US President Harry Truman, "for award by the President or at his direction to any civilian who on or after December 7, 1941 (see Attack on Pearl Harbor), has performed a meritorious act or service which has aided the United States or any nation engaged with the United States in the prosecution of World War II, and for which there is no other suitable award or recognition."

The award was for an act or service that was of high degree, but not sufficiently extraordinary or meritorious enough to warrant the Medal for Merit. The Certificate of Merit is generally awarded at the recommendation of the Medal for Merit Board, and its design must be approved by the Board. No person can receive more than one award, and the certificates may be awarded posthumously.

In 1948, 324 Certificates were awarded, including 67 for people who served in various capacities in connection with production of aircraft or aircraft components, or in connection with air carrier operations under contract to the Army Air Forces or the Air Transport Command. The remaining 257 served in some capacity with or for the Office of Scientific Research and Development.

== Notable recipients ==
- Gladys Anslow
- Kenneth Bainbridge
- Donald Balfour
- Hendrik Wade Bode
- Thomas H. Chilton
- Harry Chapin
- Lan J. Chu
- Hugh Latimer Dryden
- Robley D. Evans
- Donald G. Fink
- Ernst Guillemin
- W. W. Hansen
- Henry M. Hart Jr.
- Harold L. Hazen
- Albert G. Hill
- Arthur R. von Hippel
- Franz N. D. Kurie
- Edward H. Lambert
- Wendell Mitchell Latimer
- Richard C. Lord
- Holbrook Mann MacNeille
- Nathan M. Newmark
- Joseph M. Pettit
- W. Conway Pierce
- Ernest C. Pollard
- Mary E. Switzer
- John G. Trump
- Jerome Wiesner
- Ernst Weber
- Edwin Albrecht Uehling
- Duncan A. MacInnes
