= Tirandamycin =

Group of chemical compounds

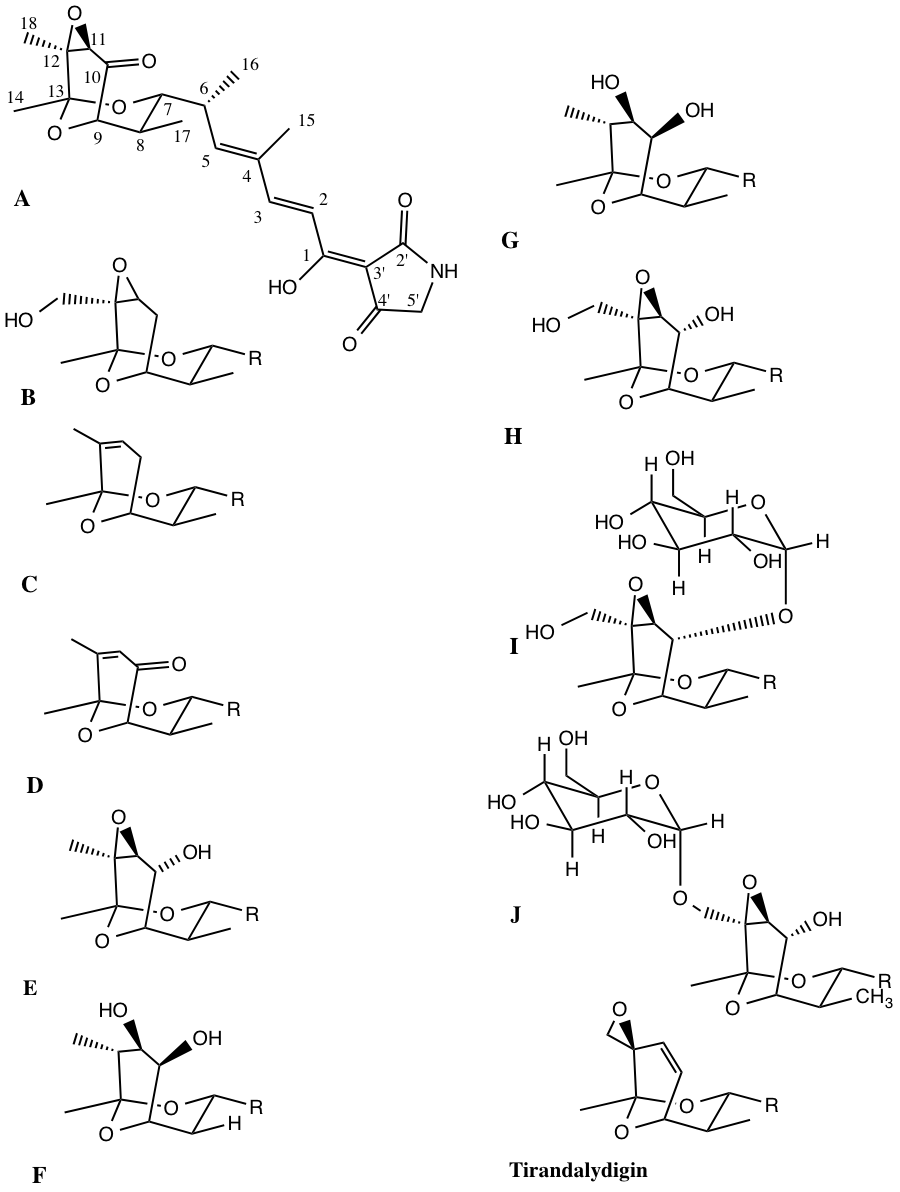
Figure 1. Tirandamycin family of structures

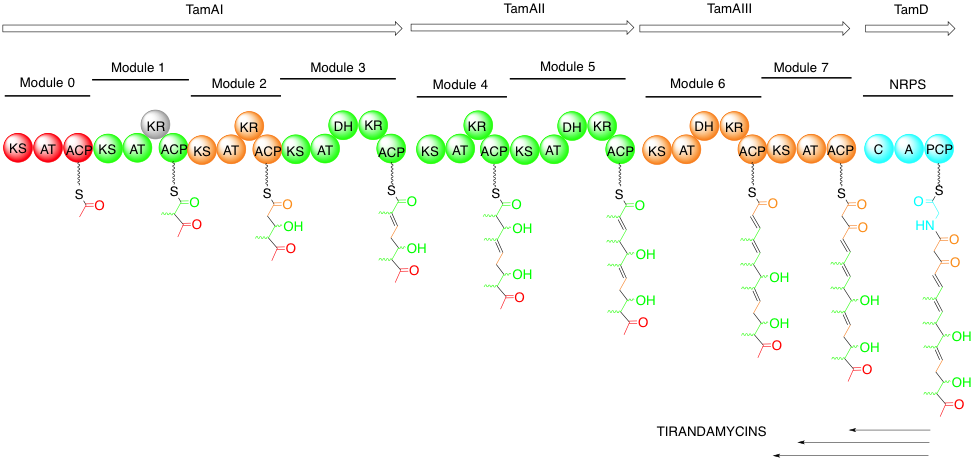
Figure 2. Biosynthetic pathway of tirandamycins

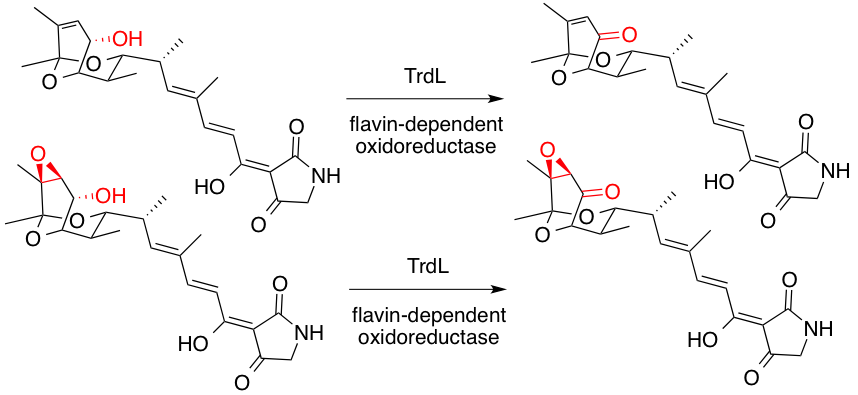
Figure 3. TrdL in vitro activity

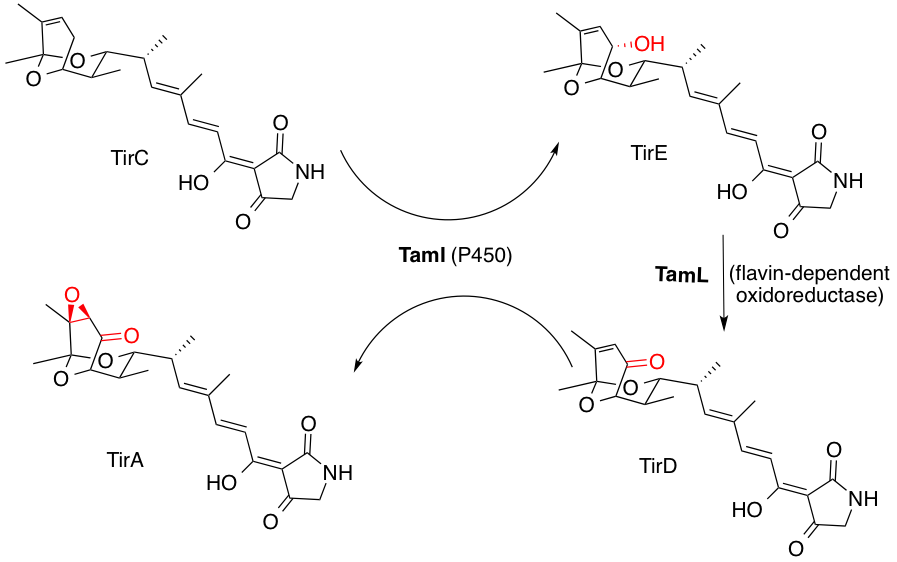
Figure 4. TamI and TamL post-translational modifications

Tirandamycins are a small group of natural products that contain a bicyclic ketal system and a tetramic acid moiety, the latter of which is found in different natural products from a variety of sources and which is characterized by a 2,4-pyrrolidinedione ring system. Members of this structural family have shown a wide range of biological activities like in antiparasitic, antifungal and anti-HIV evaluations, and furthermore, have shown potential usefulness because of their potent antibacterial properties. Streptolydigin, an analogue of the tirandamycins, is known to function as an antibacterial agent through inhibiting the chain initiation and elongation steps RNA polymerase transcription. The structural diversity in the tirandamycin family originates from the different oxidation patterns observed in the bicycic ketal system, and these modifications are determinant features for the bioactivity associated with these molecules.

== Biosynthesis ==
In the first study that looked at the gene cluster for tirandamycin production, Carlson et al. used primers specific for ketosynthase (KS) domains and CYP450 enzymes to probe the DNA of Streptomyces sp. 307-9, a previously determined producer of various tirandamycin analogues. They found that the tirandamycin gene cluster is a PKS-NRPS hybrid that codes for three proteins with two, two and four PKS modules, and one other protein containing an NRPS module. Also, that the modules 0, 2, 6 and 7 AT domains are specific for loading or extending with malonate, while modules 1, 3, 4 and 5 are specific for methyl-malonate. The A domain in the NRPS module is specific for the amino acid glycine (See Figure 2). The cyclizations to form the tetramic acids’ 2,4-pyrrolidinedione ring and the bicyclic ketal system, as well as the oxidative transformations in the bicyclic skeleton, were suggested but further experimental evidence was needed.

In another study Mo et al. characterized the biosynthetic gene cluster of the tirandamycins in Streptomyces sp. SCSIO1666 and described the function of one of the encoded proteins as a flavin-dependent oxidoreductase. This enzyme was shown to be responsible for an oxidative transformation step (namely the 10-hydroxy dehydrogenation) to an intermediate that eventually leads to the ultimate product of the pathway, suggested to be tirandamycin B. Through a study of the metabolites produced after gene inactivation of the flavin-dependent enzyme and an in vitro characterization of the activity of the enzyme, they were able to conclude that the enzyme oxidizes tirandamycin E or F to tirandamycin A or D (See Figure 3).

In the same year, Carlson et al. published another article that clarified even more the mechanisms involved in the generation of the oxidized metabolites. They studied the action of a P450 enzyme contained in the pathway (TamI) by purifying it from a recombinant host, and saw, in vitro, that it can oxidize multiple oxidation steps, namely tirandamycin A into tirandamycin B and tirandamycin D into tirandamycin A, which correspond to two hydroxylations and one epoxidation reaction. This was the first time the versatile action of a single P450 enzyme was reported. The authors also evaluated the in vitro action of the flavin-dependent oxidoreductase, formerly characterized by Mo et al., against intermediates alone and with the presence of the TamI P450, and were able to show that these enzymes work together: TamI first hydroxylates the C10 of tirandamycin C to form tirandamycin E, then the flavin-dependent enzyme converts further oxidizes C10 into a carbonyl to form tirandamycin D, which then becomes a substrate for the TamI P450 that inserts an epoxide in the C11/C12 olefin (see Figure 4).
