= Edward H. Lambert =

American neurologist

- Lambert test g-suits during WW 2
- Born: 1915; Minneapolis, Minnesota
- Died: July 27, 2003 (aged 87–88)
- Education: Morton Junior College; University of Illinois
- Spouse(s): Louise Rueckheim (m. 1950; died 1972) Vanda Lennon, 1975
- Awards: President's Certificate of Merit; American Association of Electromyography & Electrodiagnosis annual lectorship named in his honor, 1976; American Association of Electromyography & Electrodiagnosis Lifetime Achievement Award, 1995
- Scientific career
- Fields: Physiologic effects of high g-forces Electromyography
- Workplaces: Mayo Clinic

Edward Lambert (1915 – July 27, 2003) was an American neurophysiologist, best known for his description of the Lambert–Eaton myasthenic syndrome and regarded as one of the founders of electromyography.

== Early life and education ==
Edward Howard Lambert was born in Minneapolis, Minnesota; his mother was Norwegian and his father was Finnish-Scottish from Montana. During the Depression the family moved to Chicago. He was always interested in biology as a youth. After two years at Morton Junior College he received BS, MS, MD and PhD degrees from the University of Illinois. After an internship at Michael Reese Hospital in Chicago, he obtained a PhD in physiology studying the effects of oxygen and carbon dioxide concentrations on blood pressure and the vasomotor system.

== Medical career ==
In 1943, his PhD thesis caught the attention of the head of the Aero Medical Unit, a top secret research lab at the Mayo Clinic and he was invited to join the team. The lab investigated the physiologic effects of high g-forces causing blackout and unconsciousness in pilots. Lambert had an interest in the physiological problems associated with aviation; spanning World War II, he spent a total of 10 years in this area. To be able to study its effects, they built the first human centrifugal machine in the country. The research team doctors, risking their own personal safety and fitted with gradually improving g-suits, spun in the centrifuge. Lambert, described as a principal investigator and a key member of the team, was a human guinea pig in these studies, with repeated episodes of loss of consciousness. Earl Wood, director of the lab, noted that Lambert had the most time of any of the team in the machine. The pilots were at skeptical of the first Mayo Clinic g-suits and real world experiments were needed to convince them of their safety. Lambert was assigned as director of the experimental program to allay their doubts. Again, as a human guinea pig, he went up many times in a Douglas Dauntless dive bomber with an Army pilot, flying in spirals over Rochester, Minnesota, to determine if g-suits were effective. Without a suit he had 27 episodes of unconsciousness, with a total of 7.7 minutes of lack of perfusion, while the suited pilot was unaffected. This suit was worn by US pilots towards the end of the World War II, and the pilots found it to be quite effective. For his contribution to the war effort he received the Presidential Certificate of Merit in 1946.

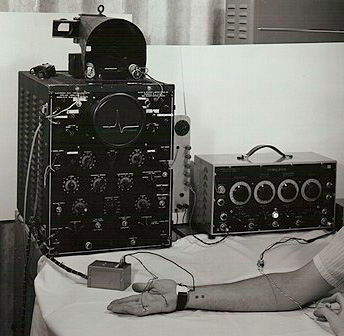
Early EMG machine at Mayo Clinic. With the assistance of his research technician, Ervin L Schmidt, Lambert developed a machine that could be moved from the EMG Lab, and was relatively easy to use. As the oscilloscope had no “store” or “print” features, a Polaroid camera was affixed to the front on a hinge, synchronized to photo the scan.(cropped)

When the war ended he stayed at the Mayo Clinic and transitioned to the second major phase of his research career, the electrophysiology of neuromuscular disease. In 1947, Lambert, building his own machine, founded the first electromyography lab in the United States and, soon after, the first EMG training program. His research began in 1948, with the application of EMG to myasthenia gravis. In 1956, he and colleague Lee Eaton were the first to describe the clinical and EMG characteristics of the disease now known as Lambert–Eaton myasthenic syndrome. This was the first pre-synaptic disease found, differentiating it from myasthenia gravis. With over 280 publications, his contributions spanned the field of peripheral neurology. His early studies established EMG as a basic neurological tool. With Peter Dyck, he defined many forms of neuropathy and with Andrew Engel he did the same for myopathies. With his wife Vanda Lennon, he helped define the immunogenesis of myasthenia gravis. Lambert mentored generations of EMG fellows, many of whom became leaders in the field of peripheral neurology; this has been called his greatest legacy. He had a mandatory retirement from the Mayo at age 70, but continued doing research and projects until age 83. He is frequently regarded as the father of EMG.

== Personal life ==
Edward married Louise ("Liz", née Rueckheim) on October 12, 1940; the couple had no children; Louise founded and acted in the Rochester Civic Theater before she died of lung cancer, age 55, in 1972. Lambert later married Vanda Lennon from 1975 until his death in 2003. They met when he flew to the Salk Institute in San Diego, California, to advise her on a research project. They married 14 months later, and in 1978 she relocated to the Mayo Clinic. They had 57 collaborative publications.
