= Cyclodiol =

Chemical compound

Clinical data
- Other names: ZK-115194; Cycloestradiol; 14α,17α-Ethano-17β-estradiol; 14α,17α-Ethanoestra-1,3,5(10)-triene-3,17β-diol; 14,21-Cyclo-19-norpregna-1,3,5(10)-triene-3,17α-diol
- Routes of administration: By mouth
- Drug class: Estrogen

Pharmacokinetic data
- Bioavailability: 33 ± 19%
- Elimination half-life: 28.7 hours

Identifiers
- IUPAC name: (8R,9S,13S)-13-Methyl-7,8,9,11,12,13,15,16-octahydro-14,17-ethanocyclopenta[a]phenanthrene-3,17(6H)-diol
- CAS Number: 116229-13-1
- PubChem CID: 146627
- ChemSpider: 18788501
- UNII: GH2S6QPT38
- CompTox Dashboard (EPA): DTXSID50921978

Chemical and physical data
- Formula: C_{20}H_{26}O_{2}
- Molar mass: 298.426 g·mol^{−1}
- 3D model (JSmol): Interactive image
- SMILES: C[C@]12CC[C@H]3[C@H](C14CCC2(CC4)O)CCC5=C3C=CC(=C5)O
- InChI: InChI=1S/C20H26O2/c1-18-7-6-16-15-4-3-14(21)12-13(15)2-5-17(16)19(18)8-10-20(18,22)11-9-19/h3-4,12,16-17,21-22H,2,5-11H2,1H3/t16-,17-,18+,19?,20?/m1/s1; Key:YGXXZMDWSWSCSI-UYUJGIFYSA-N

Cyclodiol (developmental code name ZK-115194; also known as 14α,17α-ethano-17β-estradiol) is a synthetic estrogen which was studied in the 1990s and was never marketed. It is a derivative of estradiol with a bridge between the C14α and C17α positions. Cyclodiol has 100% of the relative binding affinity of estradiol for the human ERα and similar transactivational capacity as estradiol at the receptor. It has comparable potency to estradiol when administered by subcutaneous injection. The drug shows genotoxicity similarly to estradiol. Cyclodiol showed an absolute bioavailability of 33 ± 19% and an elimination half-life of 28.7 hours in pharmacokinetic studies in women.

== See also ==
- List of estrogens § Estradiol derivatives
- Cyclotriol
