= Gestadienol acetate =

Chemical compound

Clinical data
- Other names: CIBA-31458-Ba; CIBA-31458; Norhydroxy-δ^{6}-progesterone acetate; 6-Dehydro-17α-acetoxy-19-norprogesterone; 17α-Acetoxy-19-norpregn-4,6-diene-3,20-dione
- Routes of administration: By mouth
- Drug class: Progestogen; Progestogen ester

Identifiers
- IUPAC name: [(8R,9S,10R,13S,14S,17R)-17-acetyl-13-methyl-3-oxo-1,2,8,9,10,11,12,14,15,16-decahydrocyclopenta[a]phenanthren-17-yl] acetate
- CAS Number: 14340-04-6
- PubChem CID: 22798397
- ChemSpider: 57268851
- UNII: 57N3QAK9D8
- ECHA InfoCard: 100.224.529

Chemical and physical data
- Formula: C_{22}H_{28}O_{4}
- Molar mass: 356.462 g·mol^{−1}
- 3D model (JSmol): Interactive image
- SMILES: CC(=O)[C@]1(CC[C@@H]2[C@@]1(CC[C@H]3[C@H]2C=CC4=CC(=O)CC[C@H]34)C)OC(=O)C
- InChI: InChI=1S/C22H28O4/c1-13(23)22(26-14(2)24)11-9-20-19-6-4-15-12-16(25)5-7-17(15)18(19)8-10-21(20,22)3/h4,6,12,17-20H,5,7-11H2,1-3H3/t17-,18+,19+,20-,21-,22-/m0/s1; Key:TUFRQQROGGMVOC-ZCPXKWAGSA-N

Gestadienol acetate (developmental code name CIBA-31458-Ba or CIBA-31458) an orally active progestin which was described in the literature in 1967 and was never marketed. It has no androgenic or estrogenic effects. The effects of gestadienol acetate on the endometrium and its general pharmacology were studied in a clinical trial in women. It has also been studied in a clinical trial for benign prostatic hyperplasia in men, but was ineffective.

== Chemistry ==
Gestadienol acetate, also known as norhydroxy-δ^{6}-progesterone acetate, 6-dehydro-17α-hydroxy-19-norprogesterone 17α-acetate, or 17α-hydroxy-19-norpregn-4,6-diene-3,20-dione 17α-acetate, is a synthetic norpregnane steroid and a derivative of progesterone. It is specifically a combined derivative of 17α-hydroxyprogesterone and 19-norprogesterone, or of gestronol (17α-hydroxy-19-norprogesterone), with an acetate ester at the C17α position and a double bond between the C6 and C7 positions. Gestadienol acetate is the C17α acetate ester of gestadienol. Analogues of gestadienol acetate include algestone acetophenide (dihydroxyprogesterone acetophenide), demegestone, gestonorone caproate (norhydroxyprogesterone caproate), hydroxyprogesterone acetate, hydroxyprogesterone caproate, nomegestrol acetate, norgestomet, and segesterone acetate (nestorone).
