= Cyclotriol =

Chemical compound

Clinical data
- Other names: ZK-136295; Cycloestriol; 14α,17α-Ethanoestriol; 14α,17α-Ethanoestra-1,3,5(10)-triene-3,16α,17β-triol; 14,21-Cyclo-19-norpregna-1,3,5(10)-triene-3,16α,17α-triol
- Routes of administration: By mouth
- Drug class: Estrogen

Pharmacokinetic data
- Bioavailability: 40%
- Elimination half-life: 12.3 hours

Identifiers
- IUPAC name: (8R,9S,13S,14S,16R,17R)-13-Methyl-7,8,9,11,12,13,15,16-octahydro-14,17-ethanocyclopenta[a]phenanthrene-3,16,17(6H)-triol
- CAS Number: 135768-83-1
- PubChem CID: 15967764
- ChemSpider: 8601225
- UNII: 743NA857FA
- CompTox Dashboard (EPA): DTXSID00929146

Chemical and physical data
- Formula: C_{20}H_{26}O_{3}
- Molar mass: 314.425 g·mol^{−1}
- 3D model (JSmol): Interactive image
- SMILES: C[C@]12CC[C@H]3[C@H]([C@@]14CC[C@@]2([C@@H](C4)O)O)CCC5=C3C=CC(=C5)O
- InChI: InChI=1S/C20H26O3/c1-18-7-6-15-14-4-3-13(21)10-12(14)2-5-16(15)19(18)8-9-20(18,23)17(22)11-19/h3-4,10,15-17,21-23H,2,5-9,11H2,1H3/t15-,16-,17-,18+,19+,20+/m1/s1; Key:PAMNOUDFJQSYMD-MUJBESKKSA-N

Cyclotriol (developmental code name ZK-136295; also known as 14α,17α-ethanoestriol) is a synthetic estrogen which was studied in the 1990s and was never marketed. It is a derivative of estriol with a bridge between the C14α and C17α positions. The drug has 40% of the relative binding affinity of estradiol for the human ERα. It showed an absolute bioavailability of 40% with high interindividual variability and an elimination half-life of 12.3 hours in pharmacokinetic studies in women.

== See also ==
- List of estrogens § Estriol derivatives
- Cyclodiol
