= Crotogoudin =

Names
- Other names (+)-Crotogoudin

Identifiers
CAS Number	1252665-39-6
3D model (JSmol)	Interactive image
ChEMBL	ChEMBL1269942
ChemSpider	26363423
PubChem CID	49831766
UNII	PF2YFF2459
- InChI: InChI=1S/C20H26O3/c1-12(2)15-6-10-19-9-5-14(13(3)17(19)22)11-20(19)18(15,4)8-7-16(21)23-20/h14-15H,1,3,5-11H2,2,4H3/t14-,15+,18+,19+,20+/m1/s1 Key: HXJHRPFDRBBYKZ-KRUJCJHPSA-N
- SMILES: CC(=C)[C@@H]1CC[C@]23CC[C@H](C[C@]24[C@]1(CCC(=O)O4)C)C(=C)C3=O

Properties
Chemical formula	C_{20}H_{26}O_{3}
Molar mass	314.425 g·mol^{−1}
- Except where otherwise noted, data are given for materials in their standard state (at 25 °C [77 °F], 100 kPa). Infobox references

Crotogoudin is a cytotoxic diterpene compound derived from the Madagascan croton plant from which crotobarin was similarly isolated. In in vitro studies, it showed antiproliferative activity against various human cancer cell lines.
