= BioMarin Pharmaceutical =

American biotechnology company

BioMarin Pharmaceutical Inc.
- Type: Public
- Traded as: Nasdaq: BMRN; S&P 400 component
- Industry: Biotechnology
- Founded: March 1997; 29 years ago
- Founders: Christopher Starr, Ph.D.; Grant W. Denison Jr.
- Headquarters: San Rafael, California, U.S.
- Key people: Alexander Hardy (CEO & President); Jean-Jacques Bienaimé (Chairman); Daniel Spiegelman (EVP & CFO); Brian R. Mueller (SVP, finance & CAO)
- Products: Kuvan; Naglazyme; Aldurazyme; Firdapse; Vimizim; Brineura; Palynziq
- Revenue: ▲US$3.22 billion (2025)
- Net income: ▼US$349 million (2025)
- Number of employees: 3,401 (2023)
- Website: biomarin.com

BioMarin Pharmaceutical Inc. is an American biotechnology company headquartered in San Rafael, California. It has offices and facilities in the United States, South America, Asia, and Europe. BioMarin's core business and research are in enzyme replacement therapies (ERTs). BioMarin was the first company to provide therapeutics for mucopolysaccharidosis type I (MPS I), by manufacturing laronidase (Aldurazyme, commercialized by Genzyme Corporation). BioMarin was also the first company to provide therapeutics for phenylketonuria (PKU).

Over the years, BioMarin has been criticised for drug pricing and for specific instances of denying access to drugs in clinical trials.

== History ==
BioMarin was founded in 1997 by Christopher Starr Ph.D. and Grant W. Denison Jr. with an investment of a $1.5 million from Glyko Biomedical and went public in 1999. Seed investors were amongst others MPM Bioventures, Grosvenor Fund and Florian Schönharting.

== Business development ==
In 2002, BioMarin acquired Glyko Biomedical.

In 2009, BioMarin acquired Huxley Pharmaceuticals, Inc. (Huxley), which had rights to a proprietary form of 3,4-diaminopyridine (3,4-DAP), amifampridine phosphate. In 2010, BioMarin was granted marketing approval by the European Commission for 3,4-diaminopyridine (3,4-DAP), amifampridine phosphate for the treatment of the rare autoimmune disease Lambert–Eaton myasthenic syndrome (LEMS). BioMarin launched the product under the name Firdapse.

In 2010, BioMarin acquired LEAD Therapeutics, Inc. (LEAD), a small private drug discovery and early stage development company with key compound LT-673, an orally available poly (ADP-ribose) polymerase (PARP) inhibitor studied for the treatment of patients with rare, genetically defined cancers. This acquisition was followed by the purchase of ZyStor Therapeutics, Inc. (ZyStor), a privately held biotechnology company developing ERTs for the treatment of lysosomal storage disorders and its lead product candidate, ZC-701, a fusion of insulin-like growth factor 2 and alpha glucosidase (IGF2-GAA) in development for Pompe disease. At its R&D day in October 2010, BioMarin also announced a new program for a peptide therapeutic, vosoritide (BMN-111), for the treatment of achondroplasia.

In 2012, BioMarin acquired Zacharon Pharmaceuticals, a private biotechnology company based in San Diego focused on developing small molecules targeting pathways of glycan metabolism.

In 2014, BioMarin acquired a histone deacetylase inhibitor chemical library from Repligen for $2 million with the intention of advancing work toward therapies for Friedreich's ataxia and other neurological disorders.

In November 2014, the company agreed to the acquisition of Prosensa for up to $840 million; however, the range of treatments for Duchenne muscular dystrophy failed to attain FDA approval, and development ceased in May 2016.

In October 2019 it was revealed that the group will open an office in Dublin to support further growth through Europe, the Middle East and Asia.

In December 2025, BioMarin agreed to acquire Amicus Therapeutics for $4.8 billion.

=== Acquisition history ===
The following is an illustration of the company's major mergers and acquisitions and historical predecessors (this is not a comprehensive list):

- BioMarin Pharmaceutical
  - Prosensa
    (Acq 2014)
  - - Zacharon Pharmaceuticals
      (Acq 2012)
    - - ZyStor Therapeutics, Inc.
        (Acq 2010)
      - - LEAD Therapeutics, Inc.
          (Acq 2010)
        - - Huxley Pharmaceuticals, Inc.
            (Acq 2009)
          - - Glyko Biomedical
              (Acq 2002)

== Products ==
As of 2022, BioMarin has six products on the market, each of which is an orphan drug.

- Tetrahydrobiopterin (branded as Kuvan) (sapropterin dihydrochloride), a small molecule drug for phenylketonuria, introduced in 2007 as the first medication-based intervention to treat phenylketonuria
- Arylsulfatase B (branded as Naglazyme) (galsulfase), a recombinant protein therapeutic for Maroteaux–Lamy syndrome (also called mucopolysaccharidosis type VI)
- Iduronidase (branded as Aldurazyme), a recombinant protein therapeutic for mucopolysaccharidosis I
- Amifampridine (branded as Firdapse), a small molecule drug for Lambert–Eaton myasthenic syndrome (as of 2013 approved in the EU only)
- Elosulfase alfa (branded as Vimizim), is the only enzyme replacement therapy to address the cause of Morquio A Syndrome (MPS IVA), which affects an estimated 3,000 patients in the developed world. The disease occurs as a result of a deficiency of activity in an enzyme involved in glycosaminoglycan (GAG) metabolism.
- Cerliponase alfa (branded as Brineura), is an enzyme replacement treatment for Batten disease, which is a form of neuronal ceroid lipofuscinosis. It was approved in 2017.
- Valoctocogene roxaparvovec (branded as Roctavian) is an adeno-associated viral vector for treatment of hemophilia A that aims to transfer a working copy of the Factor VIII gene into patients who lack one. It was approved in the EU in August 2022.

Biomarin is working to develop several new drugs.

== Controversies ==
In 2010, BioMarin became involved in controversy surrounding 3,4-diaminopyridine (3,4-DAP). BioMarin markets a phosphate salt of 3,4-DAP under the name Firdapse. In 2010, BioMarin was granted exclusive licensing rights to Firdapse for 10 years. As a result, the price of a prescribed National Health Service treatment course has increased from $1,987 for the unlicensed drug to $69,970 for Firdapse. The company states that prior to its licensing, there was no guaranteed quality control of the product and no way of formally monitoring for uncommon side effects through the regulatory process.

In 2013, BioMarin Pharmaceuticals was at the center of a high-profile debate regarding expanded access of cancer patients to experimental drugs. On the advice of her doctor, Andrea Sloan, a patient with advanced ovarian cancer, requested that the company provide her with access to BMN 673, an unapproved PARP inhibitor drug candidate that had exhibited promising activity in a small Phase 1 clinical trial. The company declined, citing safety concerns. Ms. Sloan eventually received a similar drug candidate from a different company.

In 2015, there was another controversy over expanded access, concerning the supply of a drug on clinical trial to a German child who was suffering from a brain disorder but who was not part of the trial.

In April 2019, the BBC reported that patients who took part in a trial treatment for the drug Kuvan (sapropterin hydrochloride) were later denied access to it. The company was criticised by the NHS and Stephen Hammond MP for patient profiteering. The company commented the following in response: "BioMarin is disappointed that the NHS England has not recognised the value of treating PKU patients with Kuvan, despite more than a decade of positive patient outcomes across 26 countries in Europe, Russia and Turkey"

In June 2019, a Belgian court ordered BioMarin to continue supplying Vimizim to a young girl suffering from Morquio syndrome free of charge. BioMarin stopped providing free Vimizim at the beginning of the year after negotiations with Belgian health authorities regarding reimbursement of the product repeatedly failed. This caused the parents to start legal proceedings to force the company to keep providing the medicine free of charge. BioMarin was ordered in a preliminary injunction to keep doing so until a definitive judgment would be rendered, or until the medicine would be available on the Belgian market at a reasonable price.
