= Gestadienol =

Chemical compound

Clinical data
- Other names: Norhydroxy-δ^{6}-progesterone; 6-Dehydro-17α-hydroxy-19-norprogesterone; 17α-Hydroxy-19-norpregn-4,6-diene-3,20-dione

Identifiers
- IUPAC name: (8R,9S,10R,13S,14S,17R)-17-acetyl-17-hydroxy-13-methyl-1,2,8,9,10,11,12,14,15,16-decahydrocyclopenta[a]phenanthren-3-one
- CAS Number: 58769-17-8
- PubChem CID: 219106
- ChemSpider: 189922
- UNII: 25L129P05Y
- CompTox Dashboard (EPA): DTXSID90974286

Chemical and physical data
- Formula: C_{20}H_{26}O_{3}
- Molar mass: 314.425 g·mol^{−1}
- 3D model (JSmol): Interactive image
- SMILES: CC(=O)C1(CCC2C1(CCC3C2C=CC4=CC(=O)CCC34)C)O
- InChI: InChI=1S/C20H26O3/c1-12(21)20(23)10-8-18-17-5-3-13-11-14(22)4-6-15(13)16(17)7-9-19(18,20)2/h3,5,11,15-18,23H,4,6-10H2,1-2H3/t15-,16+,17+,18-,19-,20-/m0/s1; Key:GDTZPEHTYWXYAR-XGXHKTLJSA-N

Gestadienol (INN), also known as 6-dehydro-17α-hydroxy-19-norprogesterone, is a steroidal progestin of the 19-norprogesterone group that was never marketed.

== See also ==
- Gestadienol acetate
