= Streptolydigin =

Chemical compound

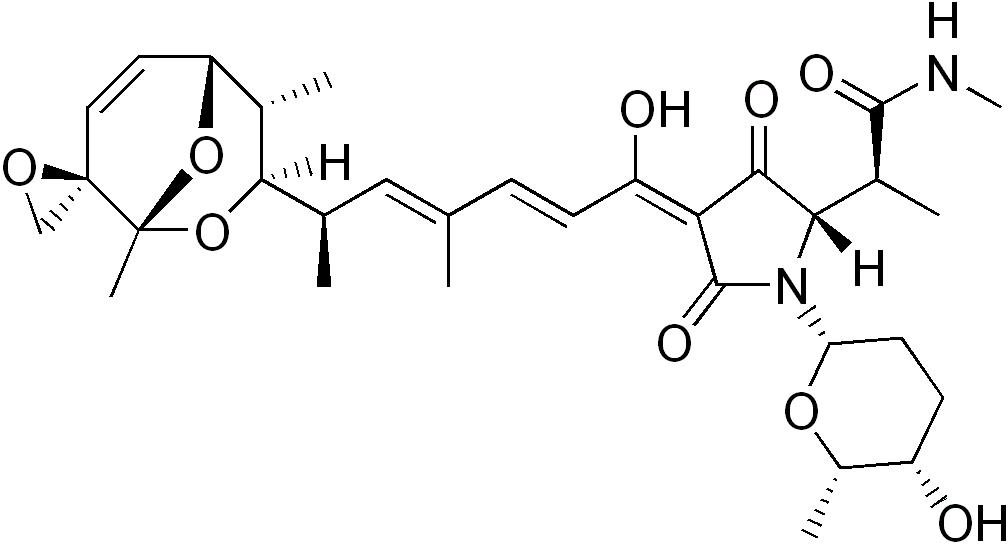

Clinical data
- ATC code: none

Identifiers
- IUPAC name: 2-[4-[6-(1,6-dimethylspiro[8,9-dioxabicyclo[3.3.1]non-3-ene-2,2'-oxirane]-7
- CAS Number: 7229-50-7
- PubChem CID: 220508
- DrugBank: DB04785
- ChemSpider: 16736035
- UNII: 6MON4029Q8
- ChEBI: CHEBI:45773
- ChEMBL: ChEMBL1236068
- CompTox Dashboard (EPA): DTXSID20905083

Chemical and physical data
- Formula: C_{32}H_{44}N_{2}O_{9}
- Molar mass: 600.709 g·mol^{−1}
- 3D model (JSmol): Interactive image
- SMILES: CNC(=O)C(C)C2C(=O)/C(C(=O)N2C1CCC(O)C(C)O1)=C(\O)/C=C/C(/C)=C/C(C)C5OC4(C)OC(\C=C/C34CO3)C5C
- InChI: InChI=1S/C32H44N2O9/c1-16(14-17(2)28-18(3)23-12-13-32(15-40-32)31(6,42-23)43-28)8-9-22(36)25-27(37)26(19(4)29(38)33-7)34(30(25)39)24-11-10-21(35)20(5)41-24/h8-9,12-14,17-21,23-24,26,28,35-36H,10-11,15H2,1-7H3,(H,33,38)/b9-8+,16-14+,25-22+; Key:KVTPRMVXYZKLIG-NCFIBNQNSA-N

Streptolydigin (Stl) is an antibiotic that works by inhibiting nucleic acid chain elongation by binding to RNA polymerase, thus inhibiting RNA synthesis inside a cell. Streptolydigin inhibits bacterial RNA polymerase, but not eukaryotic RNA polymerase. It has antibacterial activity against a number of Gram positive bacteria.
