= Pharmacological chaperone =

Drug that acts as a protein chaperone

A pharmacological chaperone or pharmacoperone is a drug that acts as a protein chaperone. That is, it contains small molecules that enter cells and serve as a molecular scaffolding in order to cause otherwise-misfolded mutant proteins to fold and route correctly within the cell.

Mutation of proteins often causes molecular misfolding, which results in protein misrouting within the cell. Accordingly, mutant molecules may retain proper function but end up in parts of the cell where the function is inappropriate, or even deleterious, to cell function. Misfolded proteins are usually recognized by the quality-control system of the cell and retained (and often destroyed or recycled) in the endoplasmic reticulum.

Pharmacoperones correct the folding of misfolded proteins, allowing them to pass through the cell's quality-control system and become correctly routed. Since mutations often cause disease by causing misfolding and misrouting, pharmacoperones are potentially therapeutic agents, since they are able to correct this defect.

Diseases that may be susceptible to such treatments include diabetes, inherited cataracts and cystic fibrosis.

== Examples ==
- Migalastat is a pharmacological chaperone for the treatment of Fabry disease.
- Tafamidis is a pharmacological chaperone for the treatment of transthyretin amyloidosis (ATTR).
- Lumacaftor and tezacaftor are pharmacological chaperones used in cystic fibrosis that target the CFTR protein.
- In 2013, mice with a disease that makes the males unable to father offspring were cured by use of pharmacoperones.

== See also ==
- Autochaperone
- Enzyme replacement therapy

== Sources ==
- Conn, P.M. and Janovick, J.A., A New Understanding of Protein Mutation Unfolds, American Scientist 93:314-321, 2005.
