= Vamorolone =

Chemical compound

Clinical data
- Trade names: Agamree
- Other names: VBP; VBP-15; 17α,21-Dihydroxy-16α-methylpregna-1,4,9(11)-triene-3,20-dione
- AHFS/Drugs.com: Monograph
- MedlinePlus: a624005
- License data: US DailyMed: Vamorolone
- Routes of administration: By mouth
- ATC code: H02AB18 (WHO)

Legal status
- Legal status: CA: ℞-only; US: ℞-only; EU: Rx-only

Identifiers
- IUPAC name: (8S,10S,13S,14S,16R,17R)-17-Hydroxy-17-(2-hydroxyacetyl)-10,13,16-trimethyl-7,8,12,14,15,16-hexahydro-6H-cyclopenta[a]phenanthren-3-one
- CAS Number: 13209-41-1
- PubChem CID: 3035000
- DrugBank: DB15114
- ChemSpider: 2299335
- UNII: 8XP29XMB43
- KEGG: D11000
- ChEBI: CHEBI:228304
- ChEMBL: ChEMBL2348780
- CompTox Dashboard (EPA): DTXSID60927527
- ECHA InfoCard: 100.032.874

Chemical and physical data
- Formula: C_{22}H_{28}O_{4}
- Molar mass: 356.462 g·mol^{−1}
- 3D model (JSmol): Interactive image
- SMILES: C[C@@H]1C[C@H]2[C@@H]3CCC4=CC(=O)C=C[C@@]4(C3=CC[C@@]2([C@]1(C(=O)CO)O)C)C
- InChI: InChI=1S/C22H28O4/c1-13-10-18-16-5-4-14-11-15(24)6-8-20(14,2)17(16)7-9-21(18,3)22(13,26)19(25)12-23/h6-8,11,13,16,18,23,26H,4-5,9-10,12H2,1-3H3/t13-,16-,18+,20+,21+,22+/m1/s1; Key:ZYTXTXAMMDTYDQ-DGEXFFLYSA-N

Vamorolone, sold under the brand name Agamree, is a synthetic corticosteroid, which is used for the treatment of Duchenne muscular dystrophy. It is taken by mouth. It is a dual atypical glucocorticoid and antimineralocorticoid.

The most common adverse reactions include cushingoid features, psychiatric disorders, vomiting, increased weight, and vitamin D deficiency.

Vamorolone was approved for medical use in the United States in October 2023, and in the European Union in December 2023.

== Medical uses ==
Vamorolone is indicated for the treatment of Duchenne muscular dystrophy.

=== Available forms ===
Vamorolone is provided in the form of an oral suspension at a concentration of 40 mg/mL.

== Side effects ==
Side effects of vamorolone in clinical trials that occurred at a rate of 10% or greater included development of cushingoid features, psychiatric disorders, vomiting, weight gain, vitamin D deficiency, and cough. The psychiatric disorders that occurred more frequently than with placebo included abnormal behavior, aggression, agitation, anxiety, irritability, altered mood, sleep disorder, and stereotypy. In addition to the preceding side effects, vamorolone shows dose-dependent suppression of the hypothalamic–pituitary–adrenal axis (HPA axis) and hence has potential risks of adrenal suppression and adrenal insufficiency with discontinuation. Vamorolone also shows immunosuppression and is expected to increase the risk of infection, among various other potential adverse effects.

Adverse events observed more frequently in the treated cohort in clinical studies included adrenal suppression, cushingoid features, psychiatric disorders, vomiting, weight gain, and vitamin D deficiency, among others.

== Pharmacology ==
=== Pharmacodynamics ===
Vamorolone is a partial agonist of the glucocorticoid receptor with relative loss of transactivation activities, but retention of transrepression activities, compared to other glucocorticoids. As a result, it is described as possessing "dissociative" glucocorticoid properties. In contrast to other corticosteroids, vamorolone is a potent antagonist of the mineralocorticoid receptor and hence has antimineralocorticoid activity.

Vamorolone has anti-inflammatory and immunosuppressive effects as well as other glucocorticoid effects but is thought to lack certain other effects typical of glucocorticoids.

== Chemistry ==
Vamorolone is a synthetic corticosteroid and is also known by the chemical name 17α,21-dihydroxy-16α-methylpregna-1,4,9(11)-triene-3,20-dione or as 16α-methyl-9,11-dehydroprednisolone. It is a derivative of cortisol (hydrocortisone) and prednisolone (1,2-dehydrocortisol).

Anti-inflammatory drugs of the corticosteroid class show a carbonyl (=O) or hydroxyl (-OH) group on the C11 carbon of the steroid backbone. In contrast, vamorolone contains a Δ^{9,11} double bond between the C9 and C11 carbons. This change in structure has been shown to remove a molecular contact site with the glucocorticoid receptor, and leads to dissociative properties.

== History ==
In phase I clinical trials of adult volunteers, vamorolone was shown to be safe and well tolerated, with blood biomarker data suggesting possible loss of safety concerns of the corticosteroid class.

In phase IIa dose-ranging clinical trial of 48 children with Duchenne muscular dystrophy (2 weeks on drug, 2 weeks off drug), vamorolone was shown to be safe and well tolerated, and showed blood biomarker data consistent with a myofiber membrane stabilization and anti-inflammatory effects, and possible loss of safety concerns. These children continued on to a 24-week open-label extension study at the same doses, and this showed dose-dependent improvement of motor outcomes, with 2.0 and 6.0 mg/kg/day suggesting benefit. These same children continued on a long-term extension study with dose escalations, and this suggested continued clinical improvement through 18-months treatment.

Population pharmacokinetics (PK) of vamorolone was shown to fit to a 1-compartment model with zero-order absorption, with both adult men and young boys showing dose-linearity of PK parameters for the doses examined, and no accumulation of the drug during daily dosing. Apparent clearance averaged 2.0 L/h/kg in men and 1.7 L/h/kg in boys. Overall, vamorolone exhibited well-behaved linear PK, with similar profiles in healthy men and boys with DMD, moderate variability in PK parameters, and absorption and disposition profiles similar to those of classical glucocorticoids. Exposure/response analyses have suggested that the motor outcome of time to stand from supine velocity showed the highest sensitivity to vamorolone, with the lowest AUC value providing 50% of maximum effect (E50 = 186 ng·h/mL), followed by time to climb 4 stairs (E50 = 478 ng·h/mL), time to run/walk 10 m (E50 = 1220 ng·h/mL), and 6-minute walk test (E50 = 1770 ng·h/mL). Week 2 changes of proinflammatory PD biomarkers showed exposure-dependent decreases. The E50 was 260 ng·h/mL for insulin-like growth factor-binding protein 2, 1200 ng·h/mL for matrix metalloproteinase 12, 1260 ng·h/mL for lymphotoxin α1/β2, 1340 ng·h/mL for CD23, 1420 ng·h/mL for interleukin-22-binding protein, and 1600 ng·h/mL for macrophage-derived chemokine/C-C motif chemokine 22.

A trial titled "Efficacy and Safety of Vamorolone Over 48 Weeks in Boys With Duchenne Muscular Dystrophy" published in March 2024 found vamorolone (Agamree) at a dose of 6 mg/kg/d showed maintenance of improvement for all motor outcomes to week 48. There was also significant improvement in linear growth after crossover in the prednisone to vamorolone 6 mg/kg/d group, and quick reversal of prednisone-induced decline in bone turnover biomarkers in each crossover group.

The US Food and Drug Administration (FDA) approved vamorolone based on evidence from a single clinical trial of 121 boys with DMD who were 4 to <7 years of age. The trial (Study 1) was conducted at 33 sites in 11 countries in Australia, Belgium, Canada, the Czech Republic, Spain, the United Kingdom, Greece, Israel, Netherlands, Sweden, and the United States. In addition to Study 1, safety was also evaluated in a separate, open-label study of children with DMD aged 2 to <4 years (N=16) and children with DMD aged 7 to <18 years (N=16).

== Society and culture ==
=== Legal status ===
Santhera Pharmaceuticals signed an agreement with Catalyst Pharmaceuticals for the North American commercialization of vamorolone in July 2023.

In October 2023, the FDA approved vamorolone (Agamree; Catalyst Pharmaceuticals) for the treatment of Duchenne muscular dystrophy.

In October 2023, the Committee for Medicinal Products for Human Use of the European Medicines Agency adopted a positive opinion, recommending the granting of a marketing authorization for the medicinal product Agamree, intended for the treatment of Duchenne muscular dystrophy. The applicant for this medicinal product is Santhera Pharmaceuticals (Deutschland) GmbH. Vamorolone was approved for medical use in the European Union in December 2023.

=== Brand names ===
Vamorolone is the international nonproprietary name.

Vamorolone is sold under the brand name Agamree. Agamree (vamorolone) is a dissociative steroid that selectively binds to the glucocorticoid receptor to exert anti-inflammatory and immunosuppressive effects. Vamorolone also inhibits mineralocorticoid receptor activation by aldosterone.
