= CDw17 antigen =

The CDw17 antigen, also known as CD17 or lactosylceramide (LacCer), is a glycosphingolipid found in microdomains on the plasma membrane of numerous cells. It has been reported on human neutrophils, basophils, monocytes, platelets, tonsillar CD45+ dendritic cells, epithelial cells, endothelial cells in intestinal epithelium, and on post-proliferative granulocytes in the bone marrow.

CDw17/LacCer acts as a precursor for the biosynthesis of an extensive array of glycosphingolipids and as a bioactive lipid involved in cell signaling. It is associated with particular types of lipid rafts, also called glycolipid-enriched membrane microdomains, where it can help organize signaling molecules involved in inflammation and immune-cell responses pathways on the cell surface and connecting them to internal cellular response cascades; in human neutrophils, LacCer-enriched microdomains have been linked to chemotaxis, phagocytosis, and superoxide generation.

== Function ==
Lactosylceramide is synthesized from glucosylceramide by lactosylceramide synthase, which transfers galactose from UDP-galactose to glucosylceramide. LacCer can then act as a precursor for more complex glycosphingolipids, like globosides, sulfatides, gangliosides, and other neutral glycosphingolipids.

LacCer also acts as a branch point for many major glycosphingolipid classes, including the globo, lacto, ganglio, and asialo series of glycosphingolipids. One example is the enzyme A4GALT aiding the transfer of galactose to lactosylceramide to form globotriaosylceramide.

Beyond its role as a precursor, LacCer has been described as a bioactive lipid. It has been associated with signaling pathways related to cell adhesion, cell migration, inflammation, angiogenesis, oxidative stress, and cell proliferation. Because it is enriched in glycolipid membrane microdomains, LacCer may help concentrate signaling molecules at the cell surface and transmit extracellular signals into the cell.

== Role in Phagocytes ==
LacCer has been studied in phagocytes, especially human neutrophils, where it is highly expressed on the plasma membrane and forms glycolipid-enriched microdomains. These microdomains are associated with signaling proteins such as Lyn, a Src-family kinase.

LacCer-enriched microdomains have been shown to be involved in many neutrophil immune functions, like chemotaxis, phagocytosis, and superoxide generation. Beyond its capacity as a structural membrane lipid, it also functions as part of a signaling platform that helps neutrophils respond to microbial or pathogenic stimuli.

The fatty acid chain composition of LacCer may affect this signaling role. Long chain C24 LacCer species have been reported to support the association of LacCer-enriched microdomains with Lyn, helping connect recognition at the cell surface to intracellular responses involved in neutrophil migration and phagocytosis.

== Interaction with Microorganisms ==
LacCer-enriched microdomains may participate in innate immune recognition by binding pathogen-associated molecules. The carbohydrate part of LacCer can interact with carbohydrate structures on microorganisms, including fungal β-glucans and mycobacterial lipoarabinomannan. These carbohydrate-carbohydrate interactions can help trigger intracellular signaling pathways involved in neutrophil movement, engulfment, and production of reactive oxygen species.

In human neutrophils, LacCer has been reported to bind pathogen-specific molecules such as Candida albicans-derived β-glucans and mycobacterial lipoarabinomannan. Studies of mycobacteria suggest that LacCer on neutrophils can interact with mannose-capped lipoarabinomannan on the bacterial surface during phagocytosis.

== Inflammation and Oxidative Stress ==
LacCer has also been linked to inflammatory and oxidative stress pathways. Several inflammatory or growth-related stimuli, including tumor necrosis factor α, oxidized low-density lipoprotein, platelet-derived growth factor, vascular endothelial growth factor, stress, cigarette smoke, and nicotine, have been reported to increase LacCer synthesis or LacCer-centered signaling.

Newly synthesized LacCer can activate NADPH oxidase, contributing to reactive oxygen species production. LacCer can also activate cytosolic phospholipase A2, which releases arachidonic acid for downstream inflammatory lipid pathways. These pathways have been discussed in relation to inflammation, oxidative stress, cell adhesion, angiogenesis, and other disease.
