= (N-acetylneuraminyl)-galactosylglucosylceramide N-acetylgalactosaminyltransferase =

Class of enzymes

Identifiers
- EC no.: 2.4.1.92
- CAS no.: 67338-98-1

Databases
- BRENDA: enzyme data
- ExPASy: NiceZyme view
- KEGG: enzyme entry
- MetaCyc: metabolic pathway
- Rhea: reactions
- PDB structures: RCSB PDB PDBe PDBsum
Search
- PMC: articles
- PubMed: articles
- NCBI: proteins

(N-acetylneuraminyl)-galactosylglucosylceramide N-acetylgalactosaminyltransferase (EC 2.4.1.92, uridine diphosphoacetylgalactosamine-ganglioside GM3 acetylgalactosaminyltransferase, ganglioside GM2 synthase, ganglioside GM3 acetylgalactosaminyltransferase, GM2 synthase, UDP acetylgalactosamine-(N-acetylneuraminyl)-D-galactosyl-D-glucosylceramide acetylgalactosaminyltransferase, UDP-N-acetyl-D-galactosamine:1-O-[O-(N-acetyl-alpha-neuraminyl)-(2->3)-O-beta-D-galactopyranosyl-(1->4)-beta-D-glucopyranosyl]-ceramide 1,4-beta-N-acetyl-D-galactosaminyltransferase acetylgalactosaminyltransferase, UDP-N-acetylgalactosamine GM3 N-acetylgalactosaminyltransferase, uridine diphosphoacetylgalactosamine-acetylneuraminylgalactosylglucosylceramide acetylgalactosaminyltransferase, uridine diphosphoacetylgalactosamine-hematoside acetylgalactosaminyltransferase, GM2/GD2-synthase, beta-1,4N-aetylgalactosaminyltransferase, asialo-GM2 synthase, GalNAc-T, UDP-N-acetyl-D-galactosamine:(N-acetylneuraminyl)-D-galactosyl-D-glucosylceramide N-acetyl-D-galactosaminyltransferase) is an enzyme with systematic name UDP-N-acetyl-D-galactosamine:1-O-(O-(N-acetyl-alpha-neuraminyl)-(2->3)-O-beta-D-galactopyranosyl-(1->4)-beta-D-glucopyranosyl)-ceramide 4-beta-N-acetyl-D-galactosaminyltransferase. This enzyme catalyses the following chemical reaction:

UDP-N-acetyl-D-galactosamine + 1-O-[O-(N-acetyl-alpha-neuraminyl)-(2->3)-O-beta-D-galactopyranosyl-(1->4)-beta-D-glucopyranosyl]-ceramide $\rightleftharpoons$ UDP + 1-O-[O-2-(acetylamino)-2-deoxy-beta-D-galactopyranosyl-(1->4)-O-[N-acetyl-alpha-neuraminyl-(2->3)]-O-beta-D-galactopyranosyl-(1->4)-beta-D-glucopyranosyl]-ceramide

This enzyme catalyses the formation of the gangliosides (i.e. sialic-acid-containing glycosphingolipids) GM2, GD2 and SM2 from GM3, GD3 and SM3, respectively.
