= Galactosidases =

Class of enzymes

Galactosidases are enzymes (glycoside hydrolases) that catalyze the hydrolysis of galactosides into monosaccharides.

The galactosidases are categorized as either alpha or beta, according to the category of glycoside they hydrolyze. The enzyme corresponding to an alpha-galactoside is called alpha-galactosidase; it catalyzes the hydrolysis of substrates that contain α-galactosidic residues, such as glycosphingolipids or glycoproteins. On the other hand, the enzyme corresponding to beta-galactosides is called beta-galactosidase; it breaks down the disaccharide lactose for instance, into its monosaccharide components, glucose and galactose. Both varieties of galactosidase are categorized under the EC number 3.2.1.

Two recombinant forms of alpha-galactosidase are called agalsidase alfa (INN) and agalsidase beta (INN). Lack of alpha-galactosidase activity in leukocytes has been linked to Fabry Disease.

Galactosidases have a variety of uses, including the production of prebiotics, the biosynthesis of transgalactosylated products, and the removal of lactose.

B-galactosidase forms the basis of lac z operon in bacteria which can be used to control gene expression.

== Uses ==
B-galactosidase can be used to track the efficiency of bacterial transformation with a recombinant plasmid in a process called Blue/White Color Screening. B-galactosidase is made up of 4 identical polypeptide chains, i.e. it has 4 identical subunits. When B-galactosidase is separated into 2 fragments, it has the unique property of regaining enzymatic activity upon the rejoining of the inactive fragments. In the process called alpha-complementation, one of the fragments (omega) is encoded by a part of a gene of the lac operon that is found in the chromosome of the bacteria, while the other fragment (alpha) is encoded by the other part of the gene that is found in the plasmid. It is only when both parts of the gene are being expressed that both the omega and alpha fragments are produced. When both fragments are present they would come together to restore the activity of B-galactosidase. However, by placing the target gene within the locus responsible for encoding the alpha fragment, one can track the presence of the desired gene in the plasmid. When the target gene is present, the alpha-fragment gene would be inactive and the alpha fragment won't be produced. In that case B-galactosidase will not be active. When the target gene is not found in the vector, the alpha fragment gene would be active, producing the alpha fragment and allowing for B-galactosidase to gain its activity. To trace the activity of B-galactosidase a colorless analog of lactose is used, X-gal. The hydrolysis of X-gal by B-galactosidase produces galactose, a blue colored compound. Therefore, when the bacteria is transformed with the recombinant plasmid B-galactosidase is inactive and the colonies appear white, but when bacteria are transformed with the original plasmid, lacking the target gene, B-galactosidase is active and the colonies appear blue.
