= Ernst Klenk =

German biochemist (1896–1971)

Ernst Klenk (14 October 1896, Pfalzgrafenweiler – 29 December 1971, Cologne) was a German biochemist, known as a pioneer in research on biolipids, their metabolism, and diseases caused by biolipid disorders.

== Biography ==
Klenk's father had a farm and a brewery in the Black Forest. However, Klenk did not want to take over his father's brewery and went to secondary school (Gymnasium) in Tübingen. After serving in WW I as a soldier from 1914 to January 1919, he studied chemistry at the University of Tübingen. At the University of Tübingen's Institut für Physiologische Chemie he in 1923, under the supervision of Percy Brigl (1885–1945), received his Promotion as Dr. rer. nat.; the doctoral dissertation is titled Verhalten von Dipeptiden und Elastin zu Phtalsäureanhydrid (reaction of dipeptides and elastin to phthalic anhydride). At the Institut für Physiologische Chemie Klenk was in 1923 appointed to the position of second assistant to the biochemist Hans Thierfelder (1858–1930) and in 1926 completed his habilitation and was then appointed a Privatdozent. In 1930 he was appointed a professor extraordinaries in the chair of physiological chemistry at the Institut für Physiologische Chemie, which was directed by Franz Knoop after the death of Thierfelder. Klenk joined in 1933 the Nationalsozialistische Deutsche Arbeiterpartei and in 1934 the Sturmabteilung. After WW II there was controversy about human tissue samples used by him and other German researchers, such as Berthold Ostertag (1895–1975) and Franz Seitelberger (1916–2007), and by the American physician and neuropathologist Webb Edward Haymaker (1902–1984).

Klenk refused an offer from the University of Marburg to become the successor in the professorial chair vacated by Friedrich Kutscher (1866–1942) and in 1936 was appointed a professor ordinarius at the University of Cologne. He established the University of Cologne's Institute for Physiological Chemistry of the Medical Faculty and headed the institute from 1937 to 1967. After WW II he was in charge of rebuilding the destroyed institute, which had been evacuated to Marburg in 1944. From 1947 to 1948 Klenk was from 1947 to 1948 of the medical faculty and from 1961 to 1962 the rector of the University of Cologne. In the early 1960s he was one of the founders of the University of Bochum. At the University of Cologne he retired as professor emeritus in 1965.

Klenk did research on phospholipids, glycolipids, cerebrosides, glucocerebrosides, sphingosines, sphingolipids, glycosphingolipids, gangliosides, plasmalogens, and polyene fatty acids. By elucidating the structure of the glucocerebrosides, he pioneered the field of lipidoses (or lipid storage diseases). His research helped to establish the cause of Niemann-Pick’s lipidosis as the storage of large amounts of sphingomyelin in the brain, liver and spleen. He found that cerebroside accumulated in Gaucher's disease. In 1935 Klenk discovered a new group of glycosphingolipids in the nervous tissue, which he called gangliosides. (The molecule GM2 ganglioside occurs normally but, due to an enzyme defect, builds up pathologically in the cells of victims of Tay–Sachs disease.)

Klenk discovered that N-acetylneuraminic acid is a characteristic of glycoproteins that are cell receptors for some (myxoviruses. His work on phospholipids resulted in his proposed structure for plasmalogens: these are not — as Robert Feulgen called them — acetal phosphatides, but 1-alkenyl-2-acyl-glycerophospholipids.

In the mid-1950s, Klenk resumed the work he had begun two decades earlier on the structure of highly unsaturated fatty acids. He succeeded in classifying many polyenoic acids as 4 basic acid types: palmitoleic, oleic, linoleic, or α-linolenic. His research involved in vivo studies on the biosynthesis of C_{20} and C_{22} polyenoic acids that showed that showed that C_{20} and C_{22} polyenoic acids arise through chain lengthening and desaturation of the 4 basic polyenoic acid types. At the beginning of the 1960s, Klenk again made gangliosides the focus of his work. He elucidated the structures of many gangliosides.

He was from 1956 to 1959 the vice-president and from 1959 to 1962 the president of the Gesellschaft für Biologische Chemie, which was renamed in 1968 the Gesellschaft für Physiologische Chemie and in 1995 the Gesellschaft für Biochemie und Molekularbiologie (Society for Biochemistry and Molecular Biology). He was a member of the editorial board of Hoppe-Seylers Zeitschrift für Physiologische Chemie.

Klenk was made Doctor mediciniae honoris causa (Dr. med. h. c.) in 1948 by the University of Cologne. He received in 1953 the Normann Medaille from the Deutsche Gesellschaft für Fettforschung and in 1958 was elected a member of the Academy of Sciences Leopoldina. He received the American Oil Chemists' Society Award in 1958 and again in 1965. Klenk received in 1964 the inaugural Heinrich-Wieland-Preis, in 1966 inaugural the Stouffer Prize (shared by Harry Goldblatt for independent research), and, posthumously, in 1972 the Otto-Warburg-Medaille.

He was since 1937 married to Grete Aldinger (who had studied with him in Tübingen). They had three sons, Hans-Dieter Klenk, Fritz Klenk, and Wolfgang Klenk.

== Selected publications ==
=== Articles ===
- Klenk, E. (1935). "Über die Natur der Phosphatide und anderer Lipoide des Gehirns und der Leber bei der Niemann-Pickschen Krankheit. [12. Mitteilung über Phosphatide.]". Hoppe-Seyler's Zeitschrift für Physiologische Chemie. 235 (1–2): 24–36. doi:10.1515/bchm2.1935.235.1-2.24.
- Klenk, E. (1939). "Beiträge zur Chemie der Lipoidosen [3. Mitteilung]. Niemann-Picksche Krankheit und amaurotische Idiotie". Hoppe-Seyler's Zeitschrift für Physiologische Chemie. 262 (3–5): 128–143. doi:10.1515/bchm2.1939.262.3-5.128.
- Klenk, E. (1941). "Neuraminsäure, das Spaltprodukt eines neuen Gehirnlipoids". Hoppe-Seyler's Zeitschrift für Physiologische Chemie. 268 (1–2): 50–58. doi:10.1515/bchm2.1941.268.1-2.50.
- Klenk, E. (1942). "Über die Ganglioside, eine neue Gruppe von zuckerhaltigen Gehirnlipoiden". Hoppe-Seyler's Zeitschrift für Physiologische Chemie. 273 (1–2): 76–86. doi:10.1515/bchm2.1942.273.1-2.76.
- Klenk, Ernst (1942). "Über die Ganglioside des Gehirns bei der infantilen amaurotischen Idiotie vom Typ Tay-Sachs". Berichte der Deutschen Chemischen Gesellschaft (A and B Series). 75 (12): 1632–1636. doi:10.1002/cber.19420751231.
- Blix, F. G.; Gottschalk, A.; Klenk, E. (1957). "Proposed Nomenclature in the Field of Neuraminic and Sialic Acids". Nature. 179 (4569): 1088. Bibcode:1957Natur.179.1088B. doi:10.1038/1791088b0. PMID 13430805. S2CID 4210408.
- Klenk, E.; Debuch, H. (1959). "The Lipides". Annual Review of Biochemistry. 28: 39–68. doi:10.1146/annurev.bi.28.070159.000351. PMID 14409798.
- Klenk, Ernst; Kahlke, Winfried (1963). "Über das Vorkommen der 3.7.11.15-Tetramethyl-hexadecansäure (Phytansäure) in den Cholesterinestern und anderen Lipoidfraktionen der Organe bei einem Krankheitsfall unbekannter Genese (Verdacht auf Heredopathia atactica polyneuritiformis [Refsum-Syndrom])". Hoppe-Seyler's Zeitschrift für Physiologische Chemie. 333: 133–139. doi:10.1515/bchm2.1963.333.1.133. PMID 14058273.
- Klenk, E.; Debuch, H. (1963). "Plasmalogens". Progress in the Chemistry of Fats and Other Lipids. 6: 1–29. doi:10.1016/0079-6832(63)90018-1.

=== Books ===
- Thierfelder, Hans; Klenk, Ernst (1930). Die Chemie der Cerebroside und Phosphatide. [With a Bibliography.]. Berlin: Springer.
  - Die Chemie der Cerebroside und Phosphatide. Springer. 9 March 2013. ISBN 978-3-642-90662-6.
