= Glycosphingolipid deacylase =

Identifiers
- EC no.: 3.5.1.69
- CAS no.: 122544-53-0

Databases
- IntEnz: IntEnz view
- BRENDA: BRENDA entry
- ExPASy: NiceZyme view
- KEGG: KEGG entry
- MetaCyc: metabolic pathway
- PRIAM: profile
- PDB structures: RCSB PDB PDBe PDBsum
Search
- PMC: articles
- PubMed: articles
- NCBI: proteins

In enzymology, a glycosphingolipid deacylase (EC 3.5.1.69) is an enzyme that catalyzes a chemical reaction that cleaves gangliosides and neutral glycosphingolipids, releasing fatty acids to form the lyso-derivatives.

This enzyme belongs to the family of hydrolases, specifically those acting on carbon-nitrogen bonds other than peptide bonds, specifically in linear amides. The systematic name of this enzyme class is glycosphingolipid amidohydrolase. This enzyme is also called glycosphingolipid ceramide deacylase.
