= Neu5Gc-GM3 =

Carbohydrate tumor antigen

General structures of sphingolipids. Typical human GM3 is represented at the far right ("a Ganglioside"). The N-glycolyl alteration adds an additional -OH group to the alpha carbon of the carbonyl group (i.e., the carbon to the right of the carbon double-bound to the oxygen).

N-glycolyl-monosialodihexosyl-ganglioside (Neu5Gc-GM3) is a non-canonical variant of the ganglioside GM3 and an established tumor antigen in humans. It is present on the cell surfaces of most studied human tumors, and upregulated by 59.3-100% in both juvenile and adult sarcomas. It contains a glycolyl group on its sole sialic acid, in place of the typical acetyl group-bearing version, rendering the sialic acid N-glycolylneuraminic acid (Neu5Gc) rather than N-acetyllneuraminic acid (Neu5Ac). Neu5Gc is not present in normal human tissues, as humans carry a fixed, inactivation mutation of the enzyme (CMAH) which synthesizes it, rendering Neu5Gc antigenic and resulting in immunogenic reactions suck as serum sickness.

== Typical GM3 ==
GM3 is a type of ganglioside, composed of a sphingosine with a fatty acid bound to the nitrogen in its amino group (making that component a ceramide) and a short sugar chain (or oligosaccharide) with one or more sialic acids linked to that chain through glycosylation. It is specifically a mono-sialylated ganglioside, synthesized from lactosylceramide via the addition of one sialic acid residue from CMP-Neu5Ac by the sialyltransferase enyzme lactosylceramide alpha-2,3-sialyltransferase (also called GM3 synthase or GM3S, encoded by the gene ST3GAL5).

Structurally, gangliosides are critical to the adhesion of cells to each other and associated structres in the extracellular matrix due to their abundance on cell surfaces and in lipid rafts. A central hallmark of cancerous cells is the ability to release from their normal environment (including adhesion of nearby cells) and invade other tissues (or metastasize). It is suspected that the altered structure and function of Neu5Gc-GM3 promotes this by weaking cellular adhesion.

== Anomalous presence in humans ==
Condensed structural schematic of Neu5Gc-GM3

Neu5Gc-GM3 is unexpected in human tissues due to its sialic acid being Neu5Gc, equivalent to Neu5Ac with an additional hydroxyl group. The enzyme which performs this hydroxylation of the N-acetyl in Neu5Ac to an N-glycolyl in Neu5Gc in deuterostomes is CMAH. In humans, it is pseudogene exhibiting a 92-bp frame-shifting deletion in a critical binding pocket relative to the orthologous copy in primates. This deletion is estimated to have occurred via a transposable element, specifically an Alu element specific to the genus Homo, roughly 2.5 to 3 million years ago. This type of deletion process is well-documented in primates and known as retrotransposition-mediated deletion, and is unusually concentrated in human evolution. As a result, the enyzme is substantially truncated and completely inactive in modern humans, who cannot synthesize Neu5Gc by any known pathway and carry circulating antibodies against Neu5Gc-containing glycans and glycoconjugates. These antibodies interact with Neu5Gc-bearing glycans (oligosaccharide attachments to molecules like lipids and proteins) in foreign, often mammalian, tissues leading to inflammatory reactions such as serum sickness, where those glycans are typically referred to as Hanganutziu–Deicher antigens.

The origin of the N-glycolyl in Neu5Gc-GM3 and its addition is thus unclear, i.e. whether it is synthesized by hydroxylation of an existting Neu5Ac residue to Neu5Gc, or via addition of an existing Neu5Gc via is unknown. In 2018, a research group suggested the hypothesis that subunit B of succinate dehydrogenase (mitochondrial respiratory complex II) could provide an alternative, hypoxia-dependent pathway for the synthesis of Neu5Gc-GM3, based on observing increased Neu5Gc-GM3 expression in hypoxic cell culture, but this has not been observed directly.

== Role in cancer biology and therapy ==
In CAR T cell therapy, a patient's own T cells are taken from a blood sample, then induced to target a chosen tumor antigen. The cell culture is then administered back to the patient, where the chimeric T cells hopefully target the patient's tumor.

As of 2026, the oncology literature suggests Neu5Gc-GM3 plays a mixed role in cancer biology, with respect to prognosis. It is known to predict tumor grade and proliferation and is highly associated with hypoxic conditions. Glycoconjugates containing Neu5Gc residues (including gangliosides like Neu5Gc-GM3) can bind with integral membrane receptors or be cleaved and released into the extracellular space, mediating immune function. Additionally, because Neu5Gc elicits humoral (or antibody-mediated) inflammation in humans, overabundance of Neu5Gc-GM3 may cause chronic inflammation and additional disease unrelated to actual tumor burden.

Due to its genetically fixed absence in healthy adult human tissues and no documented pathway for its synthesis, the origin of Neu5Gc-GM3 in human cancers remains an open question. As a neoantigenic determinant in humans (i.e., a molecular structure or epitope not normally present thus unknown to the immune system), it is also an attractive target for cancer immunotherapy, particularly in chimeric antigen receptor T cells (CAR T cell) therapy. Studies of CAR T cells cultivated to target Neu5Gc-GM3 have shown excellent performance in specificity and binding affinity.
