= Globoside =

Class of chemical compounds

N-Acetylgalactosamine

Sphingosine

Globosides (also known as globo-series glycosphingolipids) are a sub-class of the lipid class glycosphingolipid with three to nine sugar molecules as the side chain (or R group) of ceramide. The sugars are usually a combination of N-acetylgalactosamine, D-glucose or D-galactose. One characteristic of globosides is that the "core" sugars consists of Glucose-Galactose-Galactose (Ceramide-βGlc4-1βGal4-1αGal), like in the case of the most basic globoside, globotriaosylceramide (Gb3), also known as pk-antigen. Another important characteristic of globosides is that they are neutral at pH 7, because they usually do not contain neuraminic acid, a sugar with an acidic carboxy-group. However, some globosides with the core structure Cer-Glc-Gal-Gal do contain neuraminic acid, e.g. the globo-series glycosphingolipid "SSEA-4-antigen".

The side chain can be cleaved by galactosidases and glucosidases. The deficiency of α-galactosidase A causes Fabry's disease, an inherited metabolic disease characterized by the accumulation of the globoside globotriaosylceramide.

== Globoside-4 (Gb4) ==
Globoside 4 (Gb4) has been known as the receptor for parvovirus B19, due to observations that B19V binds to the thin-layered chromatogram of the structure. However, the binding on its surface does not match well with the virus, which raised debates on whether or not GB4 is the cause for productive infection. Additional research using the technique Knockout Cell Line has shown that although GB4 does not have the direct entry receptor for B19V, it plays a post-entry role in productive infection.

Globoside 4 (Gb4) are a type of SSEA, stage-specific embryonic antigen, that is present in cellular development and tumorous tissues without the mechanism of Gb4 being completely known. However a study has shown Gb4 directly activates the epidermal growth factor receptor through a ERK signaling. When the globo-series glycosphingolipid (GSL) was reduced in the experiment the ERK signaling from the receptor tyrosine kinase was also inhibited. The ERK was reactivated with the addition of the Gb4 and henceforth heightened proliferation of tumorous cells and opened up the possibility of testing Gb4 for further studies on potential drugs that can target cancerous cells.

== Globoside-5 (Gb5) ==
Globoside-5 is also known as stage-specific embryonic antigen 3.
