= Johannes Fabry =

German dermatologist (1860–1930)

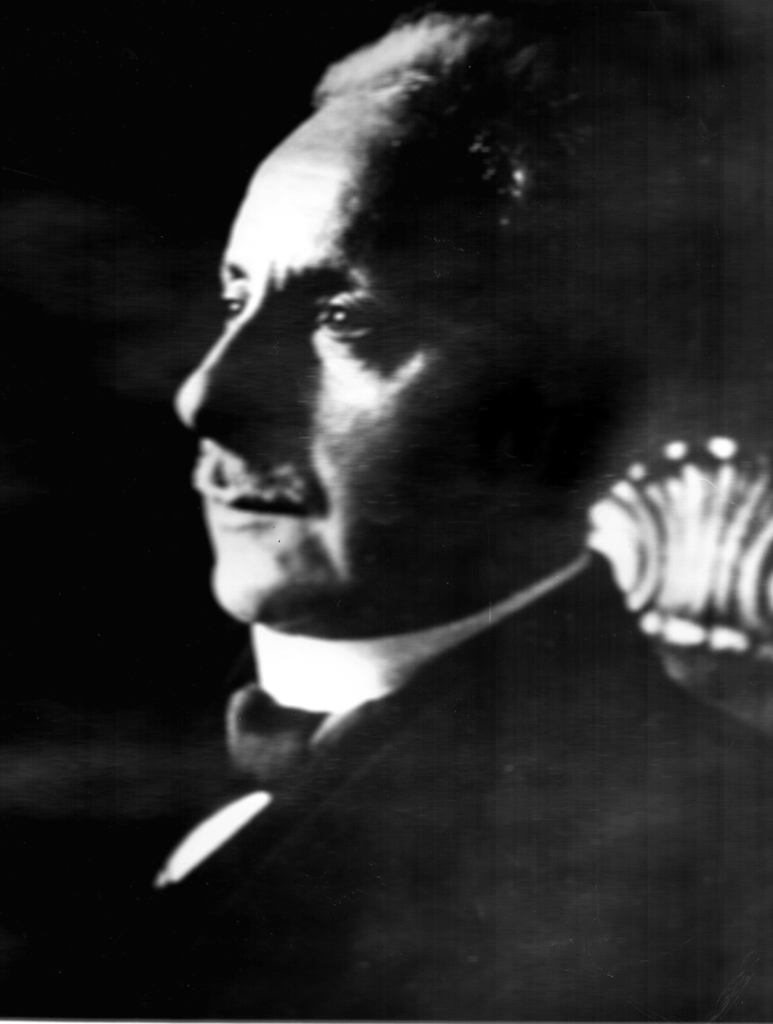
Johannes Fabry (ca. 1925)

Johannes Fabry (1 June 1860, in Jülich – 29 June 1930, in Dortmund) was a German dermatologist.

He studied medicine at the universities of Bern and Berlin, receiving his doctorate in 1886. Following graduation he trained in dermatology under Joseph Doutrelepont at the University of Bonn and with Hugo Ribbert in Zürich. From 1889 to 1929 he was chief medical officer of the Skin Clinic at the Dortmund municipal hospital, which under his guidance, became a leading center for dermatology.

His name is associated with "Fabry disease", a rare, inherited metabolic disease characterized by telangiectatic skin lesions, kidney failure and disorders of the cardiovascular, gastrointestinal, and central nervous systems. In 1898 he described dermatological features of the disease in a 13-year-old boy, naming the condition "purpura haemorrhagica nodularis". The disease is also called "Anderson-Fabry disease", named along with British surgeon William Anderson, who independent of Fabry, reviewed the progression of the disease over nearly 20 years in a 39-year-old patient.

== Works by Fabry associated with Fabry disease ==
- Ein Beitrag zur Kenntnis der Purpura haemorrhagica nodularis (Purpura papulosa haemorrhagica Hebrae). Archiv für Dermatologie und Syphilis, Berlin, 1898, 43: 187–200.
- Ueber einen Fall von Angiokeratoma circumscriptum am linken Oberschenkel. Dermatologische Zeitschrift, 1915, 22: 1–4.
- Zur Klinik und Ätiologie der Angiokeratoma. Archiv für Dermatologie und Syphilis, Berlin, 1916, 123: 294–307.
- Weiterer Beitrag zur Klinik des Angiokeratoma naeviforme (Naevus angiokeratosus). Dermatologische Wochenschrift, Hamburg, 1923, 90: 339.
