= GM2 =

GM2 can refer to:

- General MIDI Level 2
- GM2 (ganglioside)
- Gundam Musou 2
