= Glycoprotein-fucosylgalactoside a-N-acetylgalactosaminyltransferase =

Class of enzymes

glycoprotein-fucosylgalactoside alpha-N-acetylgalactosaminyltransferase

Identifiers
- EC no.: 2.4.1.40
- CAS no.: 9067-69-0

Databases
- IntEnz: IntEnz view
- BRENDA: BRENDA entry
- ExPASy: NiceZyme view
- KEGG: KEGG entry
- MetaCyc: metabolic pathway
- PRIAM: profile
- PDB structures: RCSB PDB PDBe PDBsum
- Gene Ontology: AmiGO / QuickGO
Search
- PMC: articles
- PubMed: articles
- NCBI: proteins

In enzymology, a glycoprotein-fucosylgalactoside alpha-N-acetylgalactosaminyltransferase (EC 2.4.1.40) is an enzyme that catalyzes the chemical reaction

UDP-N-acetyl-D-galactosamine + glycoprotein-alpha-L-fucosyl-(1,2)-D-galactose $\rightleftharpoons$ UDP + glycoprotein-N-acetyl-alpha-D-galactosaminyl-(1,3)-[alpha-L-fucosyl- (1,2)]-D-galactose

Thus, the two substrates of this enzyme are UDP-N-acetyl-D-galactosamine and glycoprotein-alpha-L-fucosyl-(1,2)-D-galactose, whereas its 3 products are UDP, [[glycoprotein-N-acetyl-alpha-D-galactosaminyl-(1,3)-[alpha-L-fucosyl-]], and [[(1,2)]-D-galactose]].

This enzyme belongs to the family of transferases, specifically those glycosyltransferases hexosyltransferases. The systematic name of this enzyme class is UDP-N-acetyl-D-galactosamine:glycoprotein-alpha-L-fucosyl-(1,2)-D-ga lactose 3-N-acetyl-D-galactosaminyltransferase. Other names in common use include A-transferase, histo-blood group A glycosyltransferase, (Fucalpha1→2Galalpha1→3-N-acetylgalactosaminyltransferase), UDP-GalNAc:Fucalpha1→2Galalpha1→3-N-acetylgalactosaminyltransferase, alpha-3-N-acetylgalactosaminyltransferase, blood-group substance alpha-acetyltransferase, blood-group substance A-dependent acetylgalactosaminyltransferase, fucosylgalactose acetylgalactosaminyltransferase, histo-blood group A acetylgalactosaminyltransferase, histo-blood group A transferase, UDP-N-acetyl-D-galactosamine:alpha-L-fucosyl-1,2-D-galactose, and 3-N-acetyl-D-galactosaminyltransferase. This enzyme participates in 3 metabolic pathways: the lactoseries and neolactoseries of glycosphingolipid biosynthesis, as well as the biosynthesis of glycan structures.

== Structural studies ==
As of late 2007, 19 structures have been solved for this class of enzymes, with PDB accession codes 1LZ0, 1LZI, 1R7T, 1R7V, 1R7Y, 1R81, 1WSZ, 1WT0, 1WT1, 1WT2, 1WT3, 1XZ6, 1ZHJ, 1ZI1, 1ZI3, 1ZI4, 1ZI5, 1ZJO, and 2A8W.
