= GLA (gene) =

Enzyme

Identifiers
- Aliases: GLA, GALA, galactosidase alpha
- External IDs: OMIM: 300644; MGI: 1347344; GeneCards: GLA
Available structures
PDB	Ortholog search: PDBe RCSB
PDB	List of PDB id codes 1R46, 1R47, 3GXN, 3GXP, 3GXT, 3HG2, 3HG3, 3HG4, 3HG5, 3LX9, 3LXA, 3LXB, 3LXC, 3S5Y, 3S5Z, 3TV8, 4NXS
Enzyme activity
EC #	BRENDA	ExPASy	KEGG	MetaCyc
3.2.1.22	↗	↗	↗	↗

Gene location (Human)
Chr.	X chromosome (human)
Band	Xq22.1	Start	101,393,273 bp
Band	Xq22.1	End	101,408,012 bp

Gene location (Mouse)
Chr.	X chromosome (mouse)
Band	X E3|X 56.2 cM	Start	133,488,898 bp
Band	X E3|X 56.2 cM	End	133,501,874 bp
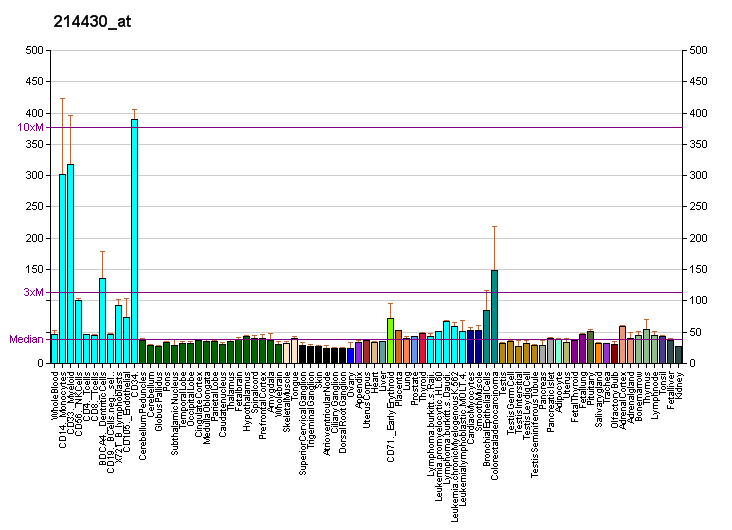
RNA expression pattern
Bgee	Human / Mouse (ortholog); Top expressed in: pancreatic ductal cell; monocyte; seminal vesicula; amniotic fluid; stromal cell of endometrium; islet of Langerhans; bone marrow; blood; granulocyte; mucosa of transverse colon / Top expressed in: decidua; granulocyte; stroma of bone marrow; morula; lumbar spinal ganglion; endothelial cell of lymphatic vessel; calvaria; blastocyst; ileum; blastocyst; More reference expression data
BioGPS	More reference expression data
Gene ontology
Molecular function	hydrolase activity, hydrolyzing O-glycosyl compounds; protein homodimerization activity; hydrolase activity, acting on glycosyl bonds; raffinose alpha-galactosidase activity; protein binding; galactoside binding; catalytic activity; signaling receptor binding; hydrolase activity; alpha-galactosidase activity
Cellular component	cytoplasm; Golgi apparatus; lysosomal lumen; lysosome; extracellular exosome; extracellular region; azurophil granule lumen
Biological process	negative regulation of nitric-oxide synthase activity; glycosphingolipid metabolic process; glycosphingolipid catabolic process; negative regulation of nitric oxide biosynthetic process; metabolism; oligosaccharide metabolic process; neutrophil degranulation; glycoside catabolic process; glycosylceramide catabolic process; carbohydrate metabolic process
Sources:Amigo / QuickGO
Orthologs
Databases	NCBI: entry; OMA: entry
Species	Human	Mouse
Entrez	2717	11605
Ensembl	ENSG00000102393	ENSMUSG00000031266
UniProt	P06280	P51569
RefSeq (mRNA)	NM_000169	NM_013463
RefSeq (protein)	NP_000160	NP_038491
Location (UCSC)	Chr X: 101.39 – 101.41 Mb	Chr X: 133.49 – 133.5 Mb
PubMed search
- Wikidata
View/Edit Human	View/Edit Mouse

Galactosidase alpha is an enzyme that in humans is encoded by the GLA gene.

Pathogenic mutations in the GLA gene impair the synthesis, folding, or stability of lysosomal α‑galactosidase A, leading to Fabry disease, an X‑linked lysosomal storage disorder characterized by deficient degradation and lysosomal accumulation of glycosphingolipids such as globotriaosylceramide.

Two recombinant forms of human α-galactosidase A, encoded by the human GLA gene, are called agalsidase alpha (INN) and agalsidase beta (INN), and are used as enzyme replacement therapy for Fabry disease.

== Structure ==
α‑Galactosidase is a lysosomal glycoprotein that functions as a homodimer, with each monomer organized into two main domains. The N‑terminal domain adopts a classic TIM barrel fold that contains the active site, including two conserved acidic residues that act as the catalytic nucleophile and general acid-base in the reaction. The C‑terminal domain forms an antiparallel β‑sandwich that contributes to overall stability, dimerization, and correct positioning of the active site. In the human lysosomal isoform α‑galactosidase A, this architecture is further stabilized by disulfide bonds and N‑linked glycans, which are important for proper folding, trafficking, and lysosomal targeting.

== Function ==
α‑Galactosidase is an exoglycosidase that hydrolyses terminal α‑D‑galactosyl residues from a variety of substrates, including glycolipids, glycoproteins, and oligosaccharides such as raffinose, stachyose, and melibiose. In humans, α‑galactosidase A cleaves α‑galactosyl groups from neutral glycosphingolipids, most notably globotriaosylceramide (Gb3), within lysosomes, thereby contributing to the normal turnover of membrane lipids. Deficiency of lysosomal α‑galactosidase A activity due to pathogenic variants in the GLA gene leads to progressive accumulation of Gb3 and related lipids in multiple cell types, causing Fabry disease, a lysosomal storage disorder.

== Clinical significance ==
=== Fabry disease ===
Globotriaosylceramide structure

Defects in human α-galactosidase A (α-GAL), encoded by the GLA gene, cause Fabry disease, a rare lysosomal storage disorder and sphingolipidosis resulting from impaired catabolism of α-D-galactosyl glycolipids. Loss or reduction of α-GAL activity leads to accumulation of globotriaosylceramide within lysosomes of vascular endothelial cells and tissues including the kidney, heart, and nervous system. This accumulation underlies the multisystem manifestations of the disease, including acroparesthesia, angiokeratoma, hypohidrosis, corneal opacity, gastrointestinal disturbances, hearing loss, and tinnitus, and may progress to life-threatening complications such as renal failure, myocardial infarction, and stroke. Fabry disease is inherited in an X-linked manner and affects approximately 1 in 40,000 males, although heterozygous females may also develop significant clinical manifestations, particularly involving the heart and kidneys, with variable penetrance.

Available treatments for Fabry disease include enzyme replacement therapy (ERT), pharmacological chaperone therapy, and supportive organ-specific management. Recombinant ERT with agalsidase α or β, approved in the early 2000s, aims to restore α-galactosidase A activity and reduce substrate accumulation, although many patients develop IgG antibodies to the infused enzyme. Pharmacological chaperone therapy represents an alternative approach, particularly for certain mutant forms, by stabilizing misfolded α-GAL and enhancing its lysosomal activity.

=== Modifying blood type group B to group O ===
α-GAL, known as B-zyme in this context, has also demonstrated its ability to convert human blood group B to human blood group O, which can be transfused to patients of all blood types in the ABO blood group categorization. The current B-zyme used comes from Bacteroides fragilis. The idea of maintaining a blood supply at healthcare facilities with all non-O units converted to O units is achieved using enzyme-converted to group O technology, first developed in 1982.

==== Advantages ====
A blood bank with ECO blood demonstrates the following advantages:

- Compatible with and transfusable to patients of all blood groups
- Reduce the demand for specific ABO blood groups A, B, AB
- Reduce cost of maintaining a blood bank inventory in hospitals
- Reduce blood transfusion reactions due to human error and ABO incompatibility
- Reduce wastage of less needed blood types

==== Mechanism of Action ====
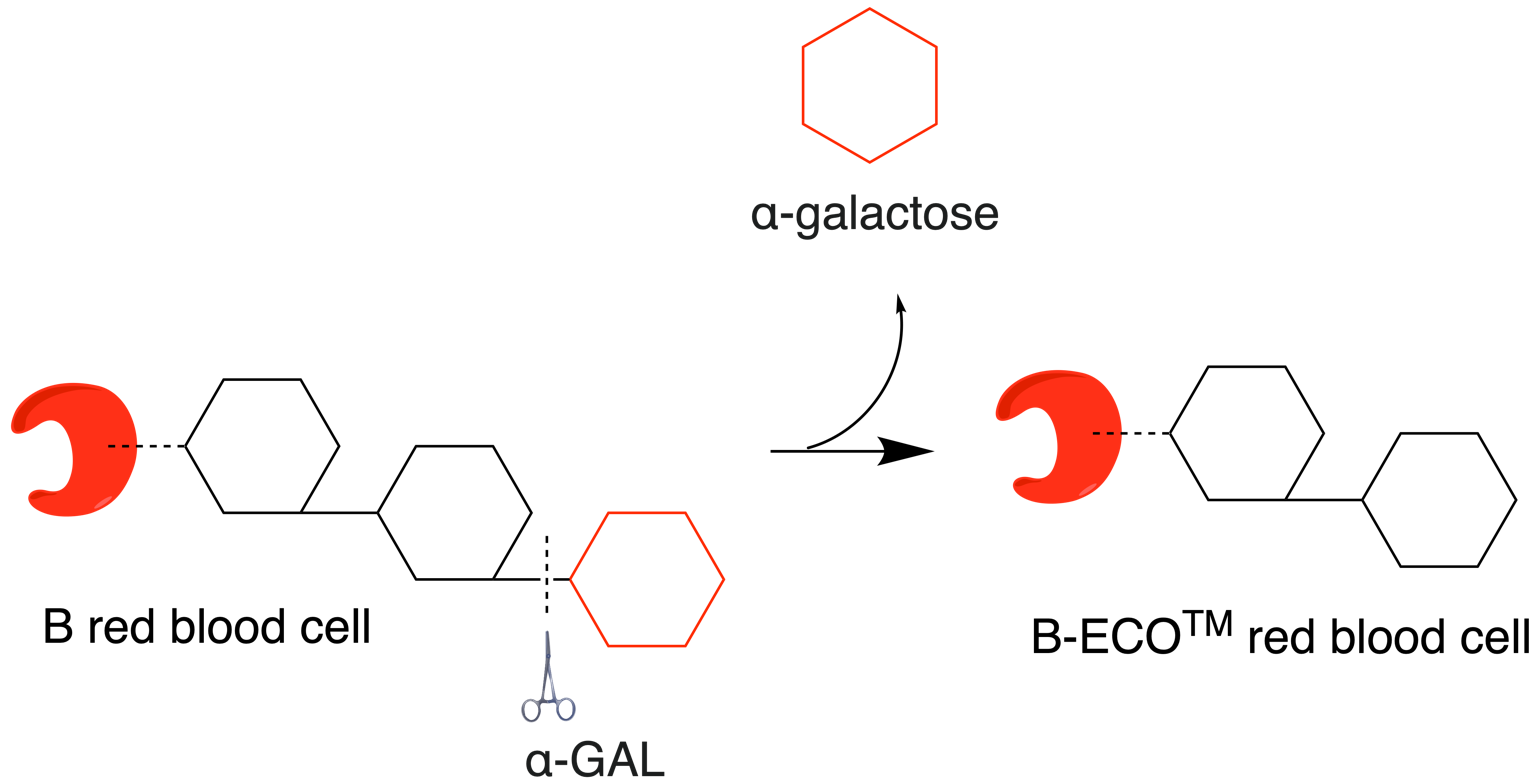
Enzyme converted to type O (ECO) technology to convert blood type B to blood type O.

Red blood cell (RBC) surfaces are decorated with the glycoproteins and glycolipids that have the same basic sequence with terminal sugar α1‐2‐linked fucose linked to the penultimate galactose. This galactose molecule is called the H antigen. Blood type A, B, AB, and O differ only in the sugar (red molecule in the illustration) linked with the penultimate galactose. For blood type B, this linked sugar is an α-1‐3‐linked galactose. Using α-GAL, this terminal galactose molecule can be removed, converting RBC to type O.

=== Supplements ===
α-GAL derived from the mold Aspergillus niger is an active ingredient in products marketed to reduce stomach gas production after eating foods known to cause gas. It is optimally active at 55 °C, after which its half-life is 120 minutes.

Commercial products with α-galactosidase include:

- Beano
- CVS BeanAid
- Enzymedica's BeanAssist
- Gasfix
- Bloateez (in India as Cogentrix)
