= GB3 =

GB3 may refer to:

- GB3 Championship, an open wheel motor racing series
- Globotriaosylceramide - It is also known as CD77, Gb3, and ceramide trihexoside
- Greater Brisbane League - formerly Greater Brisbane Base Ball Board, an Australian baseball league
- Ghostbusters: Afterlife (also known as Ghostbusters 3, and internationally as Ghostbusters: Legacy, Ghostbusters: From Beyond, and Ghostbusters: Rise), a sequel to the original Ghostbusters film.
- GB3, a solo music project by Australian performer Glenn Bennie
