= NAA60 =

Enzyme that N-terminally acetylates proteins

Identifiers
- Aliases: NAA60, HAT4, NAT15, N(alpha)-acetyltransferase 60, NatF catalytic subunit, hNaa60, NatF, N-alpha-acetyltransferase 60, NatF catalytic subunit
- External IDs: OMIM: 614246; MGI: 1922013; GeneCards: NAA60
Available structures
PDB	Ortholog search: PDBe RCSB
PDB	List of PDB id codes 5ICW, 5ICV
Enzyme activity
EC #	BRENDA	ExPASy	KEGG	MetaCyc
2.3.1.48	↗	↗	↗	↗
2.3.1.259	↗	↗	↗	↗

Gene location (Human)
Chr.	Chromosome 16 (human)
Band	16p13.3	Start	3,443,649 bp
Band	16p13.3	End	3,486,953 bp

Gene location (Mouse)
Chr.	Chromosome 16 (mouse)
Band	16|16 A1	Start	3,690,239 bp
Band	16|16 A1	End	3,722,634 bp
RNA expression pattern
Bgee	Human / Mouse (ortholog); Top expressed in: pancreatic ductal cell; endothelial cell; mucosa of ileum; parotid gland; body of stomach; mucosa of transverse colon; metanephric glomerulus; apex of heart; renal medulla; duodenum / Top expressed in: ankle joint; granulocyte; perirhinal cortex; choroid plexus of fourth ventricle; entorhinal cortex; superior frontal gyrus; visual cortex; primary visual cortex; Ileal epithelium; tail of embryo; More reference expression data
BioGPS	n/a
Gene ontology
Molecular function	histone acetyltransferase activity; transferase activity; H4 histone acetyltransferase activity; acyltransferase activity; peptide alpha-N-acetyltransferase activity; protein homodimerization activity; N-acetyltransferase activity
Cellular component	Golgi membrane; Golgi apparatus; membrane
Biological process	histone H4 acetylation; nucleosome assembly; cell population proliferation; N-terminal peptidyl-methionine acetylation; N-terminal protein amino acid acetylation; chromosome segregation; chromatin organization; histone H3 acetylation
Sources:Amigo / QuickGO
Orthologs
Databases	NCBI: entry; OMA: entry
Species	Human	Mouse
Entrez	79903	74763
Ensembl	ENSG00000122390	ENSMUSG00000005982
UniProt	Q9H7X0	Q9DBU2
RefSeq (mRNA)	NM_001083600; NM_001083601; NM_024845; NM_001317093; NM_001317094 NM_001317095; NM_001317096; NM_001317097; NM_001317098	NM_001290689; NM_029090
RefSeq (protein)	NP_001077069; NP_001077070; NP_001304022; NP_001304023; NP_001304024 NP_001304025; NP_001304026; NP_001304027; NP_079121	NP_001277618; NP_083366
Location (UCSC)	Chr 16: 3.44 – 3.49 Mb	Chr 16: 3.69 – 3.72 Mb
PubMed search
- Wikidata
View/Edit Human	View/Edit Mouse

Nα-acetyltransferase 60 (NAA60) also known as NatF is a member of the N-terminal acetyltransferase (NAT) family of proteins. NATs bind to acetyl-coenzyme A (Ac-CoA) as well as to the protein N-terminus, and enzymatically transfer the acetyl group from Ac-CoA to the free backbone amino group (NH_{3}^{+}) on the first residue of the protein. NATs are mono- or multisubunit enzymes consisting of one catalytic subunit and up to two auxiliary subunits, however, only a catalytic subunit of NAA60 has been identified so far.

== Structure ==
The crystal structure of NAA60 was solved in 2016, though it was missing the C-terminal region due to difficulties purifying the whole protein. The structure revealed an overall fold that is similar to the catalytic subunit of ribosome-associated NATs, and the two residues Y164 and Y165 of the β6-β7 loop important for peptide anchoring is conserved in NAA60 as in multiple NATs. Most similarities in the active site of NAA60 were found to NAA50. The two NATs share several residues that make up a hydrophobic core recognizing the Nt-Met of their substrates. However, this cavity is larger and more solvent exposed in NAA60 to accommodate larger and more polar residues in position 2 and 3 of its substrates.

Through biochemical analysis, the C-terminal end has been found to be important for binding to intracellular membranes but not for its biochemical function. Two amphipathic α-helices near the C-terminus (residues 190-202 and 211-224) have been identified as mediators of the membrane interaction

== Subcellular localization ==
NAA60 localizes to the Golgi apparatus, making it the only organellar bound NAT described to date. NAA10 through NAA50 all exhibit a cytoplasmic or nuclear localization. Both endogenous and overexpressed NAA60 colocalizes with the cis-Golgi marker GM130, as well as identifying it in vesicles colocalizing with markers for peroxisomes, endosomes, lysosomes, and secretory vesicles

NAA60 has shown binding preference to membranes containing the phosphatidylinositol 4-phosphate lipid, possibly explaining its residence in Golgi membranes which are rich in these lipids. All parts of the protein, including the GNAT domain, face the cytosol which limits NAA60`s catalytic activity to the cytosolic side of membranes.

== Substrate specificity ==
NAA60, together with NatC and NatE, is able to acetylate methionine starting N-termini followed by hydrophobic or amphiphatic-type amino acids (ML-, MI-, MF-, MY-, and MK-). NAA60 show further substrate specificity towards membrane proteins with their N-termini facing the cytosol. From an N-terminomic analysis of NAA60 knock-down (KD) cells, 23 substrates of NAA60 were found, of which 21 were membrane proteins located either in the ER, plasma membrane, Golgi, mitochondria, or vesicular membranes.

== Disease ==
NAA60 was found to be important in brain phosphate homeostasis. It was identified as causative of the genetic disease primary familial brian calcification (PFBC). PFBC is a neurodegenerative disease characterized by bilateral calcification distributed in the basal ganglia, thalamus, and cerebellum. Symptoms could be generally grouped as movement disorders, cognitive decline, and psychiatric disturbances. In the study by Chelban and Aksnes et al. 10 individuals with PFBC from 7 different families were presented with biallelic variants of NAA60. In NAA60 KD cells, one have previously observed Golgi fragmentation leading to the hypothesis that NAA60 is essential for the N-terminal acetylation of membrane proteins critical for normal Golgi function. Findings from the aforementioned study indicate a decrease in surface levels of SLC20A2 (another kown PFBC-related protein) when NAA60 is lacking, but no clear explanation of the molecular mechanism behind PFBC exists at this time.
