= Primary familial brain calcification =

Genetic disorder involving calcification of the basal ganglia

- Other names: Familial idiopathic basal ganglia calcification
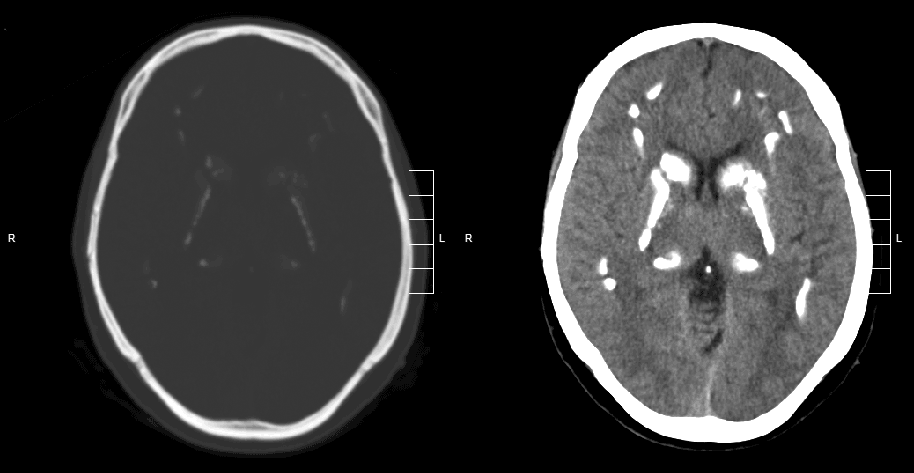
- CT scan of characteristic calcifications of the disease
- Specialty: Neurology
- Frequency: 0.0001%

Primary familial brain calcification (PFBC), also known as familial idiopathic basal ganglia calcification (FIBGC) and Fahr's disease, is a rare, genetically dominant or recessive, inherited neurological disorder characterized by abnormal deposits of calcium in areas of the brain that control movement. Through the use of CT scans, calcifications are seen primarily in the basal ganglia and in other areas such as the cerebral cortex.

== Signs and symptoms ==
Symptoms of this disease include deterioration of motor functions and speech, seizures, and other involuntary movement. Other symptoms are headaches, dementia, and vision impairment. Characteristics of Parkinson's Disease are also similar to PFBC.

The disease usually manifests itself in the third to fifth decade of life but may appear in childhood or later in life. It usually presents with clumsiness, fatigability, unsteady gait, slow or slurred speech, difficulty swallowing, involuntary movements or muscle cramping. Seizures of various types are common. Neuropsychiatric symptoms, which may be the first or the most prominent manifestations, range from mild difficulty with concentration and memory to changes in personality and/or behavior, to psychosis and dementia.

== Causes ==
This condition can be inherited in an autosomal dominant or recessive fashion. Several genes have been associated with this condition.

=== Mutation ===
A locus at 14q has been suggested, but no gene has been identified. A second locus has been identified on chromosome 8 and a third has been reported on chromosome 2. This suggests there may be some genetic heterogeneity in this disease.

A mutation in the gene encoding the type III sodium dependent phosphate transporter 2 (SLC20A2) located on chromosome 8 has been reported. Biochemical evidence suggests that phosphate transport may be involved in this disease.

Two other genes have been associated with this condition: PDGFB on chromosome 22 and PDGFRB on chromosome 5. These genes are biochemically linked: PDGFRB encodes the platelet-derived growth factor receptor β and PDGFB encodes the ligand of PDGF-Rβ. These genes are active during angiogenesis to recruit pericytes which suggests that alterations in the blood brain barrier may be involved in the pathogenesis of this condition.

A fourth gene associated with this condition is XPR1. This gene is the long arm of located on chromosome 1 (1q25.3).

Another gene that has been associated with this condition is MYORG. This gene is located on the long arm of chromosome 9 (9p13.3). This gene is associated with an autosomal recessive inheritance pattern in this condition.

Another gene junctional adhesion molecule 2 (JAM2) has been associated with an autosomal recessive form of this condition.

The most recently found gene to be associated with PFBC is Nα-acetyltransferase 60 (NAA60). NAA60 is a protein belonging to the family of N-terminal acetyltransferases (NATs), which catalyze the transfer of an acetyl group from acetyl-coenzyme A (Ac-CoA) to the N-terminus of proteins. NAA60 is specifically localized to the Golgi apparatus and can acetylate membrane proteins post-translationally that have cytosolic N-termini starting with methionine followed by hydrophobic- or amphipathic-type amino acids (ML-, MI-, MF-, MY-, and MK-).

== Pathology ==
The most commonly affected region of the brain is the lenticular nucleus and in particular the internal globus pallidus. Calcifications in the caudate, dentate nuclei, putamen and thalami are also common. Occasionally calcifications begin or predominate in regions outside the basal ganglia.

Calcification seems to be progressive, since calcifications are generally more extensive in older individuals and an increase in calcification can sometimes be documented on follow up of affected subjects.

As well as the usual sites the cerebellar gyri, brain stem, centrum semiovale and subcortical white matter may also be affected. Diffuse atrophic changes with dilatation of the subarachnoid space and/or ventricular system may coexist with the calcifications. Histologically concentric calcium deposits within the walls of small and medium-sized arteries are present. Less frequently the veins may also be affected. Droplet calcifications can be observed along capillaries. These deposits may eventually lead to closure of the lumina of vessels.

The pallidal deposits stain positively for iron. Diffuse gliosis may surround the large deposits but significant loss of nerve cells is rare. On electron microscopy the mineral deposits appear as amorphous or crystalline material surrounded by a basal membrane. Calcium granules are seen within the cytoplasm of neuronal and glial cells. The calcifications seen in this condition are indistinguishable from those secondary to hypoparathyroidism or other causes.

== Diagnosis ==
In addition to the usual routine haematologic and biochemical investigations, the serum calcium, phosphorus, magnesium, alkaline phosphatase, calcitonin and parathyroid hormone should also be measured. The cerebrospinal fluid (CSF) should be examined to exclude bacteria, viruses and parasites. The Ellsworth Howard test (a 10–20 fold increase of urinary cyclic AMP excretion following stimulation with 200 micromoles of parathyroid hormone) may be worth doing also. Serology for toxoplasmosis is also indicated.

Brain CT scan is the preferred method of localizing and assessing the extent of cerebral calcifications.

Elevated levels of copper, iron, magnesium and zinc but not calcium have been reported in the CSF but the significance of this finding—if any—is not known.

The diagnosis requires the following criteria be met:

1. the presence of bilateral calcification of the basal ganglia
2. the presence of progressive neurologic dysfunction
3. the absence of an alternative metabolic, infectious, toxic or traumatic cause
4. a family history consistent with autosomal dominant inheritance

The calcification is usually identified on CT scan but may be visible on plain films of the skull.

=== Differential diagnosis ===
Basal ganglia calcification may occur as a consequence of several other known genetic conditions and these have to be excluded before a diagnosis can be made.

== Management ==
There is currently no cure for PFBC nor a standard course of treatment. The available treatment is directed symptomatic control. If parkinsonian features develop, there is generally poor response to levodopa therapy. Case reports have suggested that haloperidol or lithium carbonate may help with psychotic symptoms. One case report described an improvement with the use of a bisphosphonate.

== Prognosis ==
The prognosis for any individual with PFBC is variable and hard to predict. There is no reliable correlation between age, extent of calcium deposits in the brain, and neurological deficit. Since the appearance of calcification is age-dependent, a CT scan could be negative in a gene carrier who is younger than the age of 55.

Progressive neurological deterioration generally results in disability and death.

== History ==
The disease was first noted by German pathologist Karl Theodor Fahr in 1930. A less common name for the condition is Chavany-Brunhes syndrome and Fritsche's syndrome, the former named after Jacques Brunhes, Jean Alfred Émile Chavany, while the later named after R. Fritsche.

Fewer than 20 families had been reported in the literature up to 1997.

== See also ==
- Primrose syndrome
