= Cornea verticillata =

- Other names: Fleischer vortex
- Cornea verticillata: A bilateral, whorl-like corneal pattern of cream colored lines in a patient with Fabry disease.
- Specialty: Ophthalmology
- Treatment: Discontinuation of the offending drug results in complete resolution of the opacity.

Cornea verticillata, also called vortex keratopathy or whorl keratopathy, is a condition characterised by corneal deposits at the level of the basal epithelium forming a faint golden-brown whorl pattern. It is seen in Fabry disease or in case of prolonged amiodarone intake. Furthermore, it is a common adverse side effect of the use of rho-kinase inhibitors in glaucoma therapy.

== Presentation ==
No ocular complaints or visual difficulty is usually present.

== Pathophysiology ==
This keratopathy is probably a type of drug-induced lipidosis.
