= Xenotropic and polytropic retrovirus receptor 1 =

Protein found in humans

XPR1
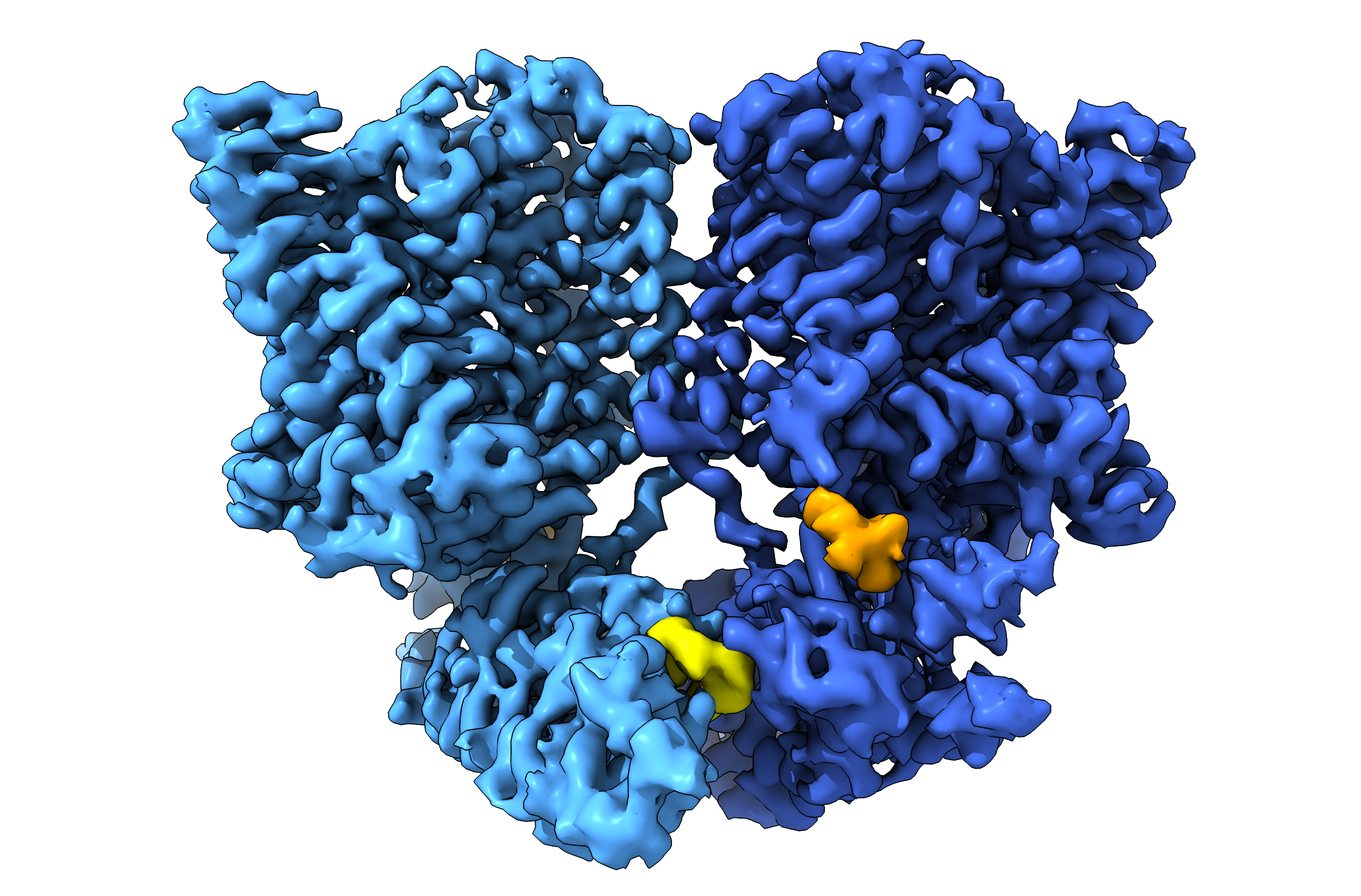

Identifiers
- Aliases: XPR1, SYG1, X3, IBGC6, xenotropic and polytropic retrovirus receptor 1, SLC53A1
- External IDs: OMIM: 605237; MGI: 97932; GeneCards: XPR1
Available structures
PDB	Ortholog search: PDBe RCSB
PDB	List of PDB id codes 5IJH

Gene location (Human)
Chr.	Chromosome 1 (human)
Band	1q25.3	Start	180,632,022 bp
Band	1q25.3	End	180,890,279 bp

Gene location (Mouse)
Chr.	Chromosome 1 (mouse)
Band	1 G3|1 66.49 cM	Start	155,151,447 bp
Band	1 G3|1 66.49 cM	End	155,293,161 bp
RNA expression pattern
Bgee	Human / Mouse (ortholog); Top expressed in: myocardium of left ventricle; ganglionic eminence; secondary oocyte; endothelial cell; nasal epithelium; pancreatic epithelial cell; cardiac muscle tissue of right atrium; islet of Langerhans; Brodmann area 23; right ventricle / Top expressed in: median eminence; ventromedial nucleus; lateral septal nucleus; arcuate nucleus; habenula; ascending aorta; dorsomedial hypothalamic nucleus; extensor digitorum longus muscle; mammillary body; triceps brachii muscle; More reference expression data
BioGPS	n/a
Gene ontology
Molecular function	G protein-coupled receptor activity; transmembrane signaling receptor activity; phosphate ion transmembrane transporter activity; inositol hexakisphosphate binding; virus receptor activity; efflux transmembrane transporter activity; signaling receptor activity
Cellular component	integral component of membrane; membrane; intrinsic component of plasma membrane; plasma membrane; cytoplasm; Golgi apparatus
Biological process	viral entry into host cell; G protein-coupled receptor signaling pathway; response to virus; cellular phosphate ion homeostasis; phosphate ion transmembrane transport; phosphate ion transport; cellular response to phosphate starvation
Sources:Amigo / QuickGO
Orthologs
Databases	NCBI: entry; OMA: entry
Species	Human	Mouse
Entrez	9213	19775
Ensembl	ENSG00000143324	ENSMUSG00000026469
UniProt	Q9UBH6	Q9Z0U0
RefSeq (mRNA)	NM_004736; NM_001135669; NM_001328662	NM_011273
RefSeq (protein)	NP_001129141; NP_001315591; NP_004727	NP_035403
Location (UCSC)	Chr 1: 180.63 – 180.89 Mb	Chr 1: 155.15 – 155.29 Mb
PubMed search
- Wikidata
View/Edit Human	View/Edit Mouse

Xenotropic and polytropic retrovirus receptor 1 is a protein that in humans is encoded by the XPR1 gene.

== Gene ==
It is a member of the solute carrier (SLC) family, specifically classified as SLC53A1.

== Structure ==
XPR1 is characterized by a unique architecture that includes a transmembrane domain (TMD) and a cytoplasmic SPX domain. The TMD is composed of multiple transmembrane helices that form a channel-like structure. Recent cryo-electron microscopy (cryo-EM) studies have revealed various conformational states of XPR1, including inactive (closed) and active (open) forms, as well as intermediate states.

== Function ==
XPR1 is crucial for maintaining cellular phosphate homeostasis by facilitating the efflux of inorganic phosphate (Pi) from cells. Mutations in XPR1 that disrupt its phosphate export function are linked to Primary familial brain calcification (PFBC), a neurological condition characterized by abnormal hydroxyapatite deposits in the brain.

Notably, XPR1 features dual binding sites for Inositol phosphate(IPs) and inositol pyrophosphates (PP-IPs), which regulate its activity.

Electrophysiological studies on XPR1 showed that XPR1 functions primarily as a PP-IPs gated Pi channel, playing a pivotal role in preventing the accumulation of excess intracellular phosphate, which can lead to metabolic disorders. It responds to the cellular levels of IPs and PP-IPs, with PP-IPs acting as more potent activators of XPR1 compared to IPs. The binding of these signaling molecules induces conformational changes in XPR1, facilitating the opening of the channel and allowing phosphate ions to exit the cell.
