= A4GALT =

Protein-coding gene in the species Homo sapiens

Identifiers
- Aliases: A4GALT, A14GALT, A4GALT1, Gb3S, P(k), P1, P1PK, PK, alpha 1,4-galactosyltransferase, alpha 1,4-galactosyltransferase (P blood group)
- External IDs: OMIM: 607922; MGI: 3512453; GeneCards: A4GALT
Enzyme activity
EC #	BRENDA	ExPASy	KEGG	MetaCyc
2.4.1.228	↗	↗	↗	↗

Gene location (Human)
Chr.	Chromosome 22 (human)
Band	22q13.2	Start	42,692,121 bp
Band	22q13.2	End	42,721,298 bp

Gene location (Mouse)
Chr.	Chromosome 15 (mouse)
Band	15|15 E1	Start	83,110,923 bp
Band	15|15 E1	End	83,135,975 bp
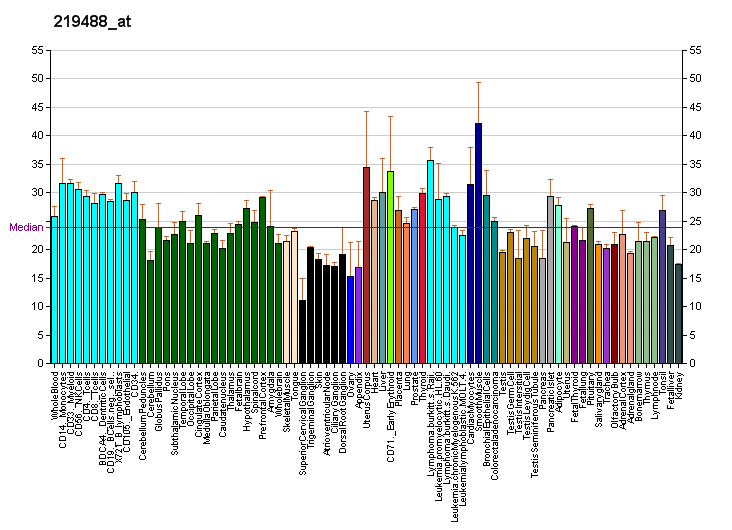
RNA expression pattern
Bgee	Human / Mouse (ortholog); Top expressed in: apex of heart; olfactory zone of nasal mucosa; right auricle of heart; gastric mucosa; tibial nerve; left ventricle; thoracic aorta; ascending aorta; popliteal artery; tibial arteries / Top expressed in: decidua; seminal vesicula; interventricular septum; choroid plexus of fourth ventricle; cardiac muscle tissue of left ventricle; entorhinal cortex; plantaris muscle; extensor digitorum longus muscle; corneal stroma; zygote; More reference expression data
BioGPS	More reference expression data
Gene ontology
Molecular function	transferase activity; lactosylceramide 4-alpha-galactosyltransferase activity; galactosyltransferase activity; toxic substance binding; glycosyltransferase activity
Cellular component	integral component of membrane; integral component of Golgi membrane; Golgi membrane; Golgi apparatus; membrane
Biological process	glycosphingolipid biosynthetic process; globoside biosynthetic process; protein glycosylation; plasma membrane organization; lipid metabolism
Sources:Amigo / QuickGO
Orthologs
Databases	NCBI: entry; OMA: entry
Species	Human	Mouse
Entrez	53947	239559
Ensembl	ENSG00000128274	ENSMUSG00000047878
UniProt	Q9NPC4	Q67BJ4
RefSeq (mRNA)	NM_017436; NM_001318038	NM_001004150; NM_001170954; NM_001370647
RefSeq (protein)	NP_001304967; NP_059132	NP_001004150; NP_001164425; NP_001357576
Location (UCSC)	Chr 22: 42.69 – 42.72 Mb	Chr 15: 83.11 – 83.14 Mb
PubMed search
- Wikidata
View/Edit Human	View/Edit Mouse

Lactosylceramide 4-alpha-galactosyltransferase is an enzyme that in humans is encoded by the A4GALT gene.

The protein encoded by this gene catalyzes the transfer of galactose to lactosylceramide to form globotriaosylceramide, which has been identified as the P(k) antigen of the P blood group system. The encoded protein, which is a type II membrane protein found in the Golgi, is also required for the synthesis of the bacterial verotoxins receptor.
