= Globotriaosylceramide =

Globotriaosylceramide (R is a carbon chain)

Globotriaosylceramide is a globoside. It is also known as CD77, Gb3, GL3, and ceramide trihexoside. It is one of the few clusters of differentiation that is not a protein.

It is formed by the alpha linkage of galactose to lactosylceramide catalyzed by A4GALT.

It is metabolized by alpha-galactosidase, which hydrolyzes the terminal alpha linkage.

== Clinical significance ==
Defects in the enzyme alpha-galactosidase lead to the buildup of globotriaosylceramide, causing Fabry's disease. The pharmaceutical drug migalastat enhances the function of alpha-galactosidase and is used to treat Fabry's.

Globotriaosylceramide is also one of the targets of Shiga toxin, which is responsible for pathogenicity of enterohemorrhagic Escherichia coli (EHEC).

The bacterial Shiga toxin can be used for targeted therapy of certain gastrointestinal cancers that express the receptor of the Shiga toxin. For this purpose a non-specific chemotherapeutic agent is conjugated to the B-subunit to make it specific. In this way only the tumor cells, but not healthy cells, should be destroyed during therapy.

Furthermore, GB3/CD77 is has been shown to play an important role in B cell malignancies, such as Burkitt's Lymphoma where it causes the dissociation of CD19 from CD81, and subsequently induce BCR signalling.
