= MYORG =

Identifiers
- Aliases: MYORG, NET37, KIAA1161, myogenesis regulating glycosidase (putative), IBGC7
- External IDs: OMIM: 618255; MGI: 2140300; GeneCards: MYORG
Enzyme activity
EC #	BRENDA	ExPASy	KEGG	MetaCyc
3.2.1.22	↗	↗	↗	↗

Gene location (Human)
Chr.	Chromosome 9 (human)
Band	9p13.3	Start	34,366,666 bp
Band	9p13.3	End	34,376,898 bp

Gene location (Mouse)
Chr.	Chromosome 4 (mouse)
Band	4|4 A5	Start	41,495,604 bp
Band	4|4 A5	End	41,503,076 bp
RNA expression pattern
Bgee	Human / Mouse (ortholog); Top expressed in: ventricular zone; gastrocnemius muscle; muscle of thigh; vastus lateralis muscle; mucosa of ileum; jejunal mucosa; Skeletal muscle tissue of rectus abdominis; right lobe of liver; biceps brachii; putamen / Top expressed in: muscle of thigh; plantaris muscle; extensor digitorum longus muscle; triceps brachii muscle; quadriceps femoris muscle; skeletal muscle tissue; sternocleidomastoid muscle; triceps surae; gastrocnemius muscle; digastric muscle; More reference expression data
BioGPS	n/a
Gene ontology
Molecular function	hydrolase activity; hydrolase activity, hydrolyzing O-glycosyl compounds; hydrolase activity, acting on glycosyl bonds
Cellular component	integral component of membrane; membrane; nuclear membrane; endoplasmic reticulum membrane; nucleus; endoplasmic reticulum
Biological process	metabolism; carbohydrate metabolic process; positive regulation of insulin-like growth factor receptor signaling pathway; positive regulation of protein kinase B signaling; glycoside catabolic process; skeletal muscle fiber development
Sources:Amigo / QuickGO
Orthologs
Databases	NCBI: entry; OMA: entry
Species	Human	Mouse
Entrez	57462	329828
Ensembl	ENSG00000164976	ENSMUSG00000046312
UniProt	Q6NSJ0	Q69ZQ1
RefSeq (mRNA)	NM_020702	NM_001085515
RefSeq (protein)	NP_065753	NP_001078984
Location (UCSC)	Chr 9: 34.37 – 34.38 Mb	Chr 4: 41.5 – 41.5 Mb
PubMed search
- Wikidata
View/Edit Human	View/Edit Mouse

Myogenesis-regulating glycosidase is an enzyme that in humans is encoded by the MYORG gene. Mutations in this gene are associated with primary familial brain calcification (PFBC).
