= Ganglioside =

Class of chemical compounds

Representative structures of basic glycolipid categories.

Gangliosides are a category of glycolipids abundant in the nervous tissue of most vertebrates. Specifically, they are a type of glycosphingolipid, composed of a ceramide (a sphingosine with a fatty acid bound to the nitrogen atom in its amino group) and a short sugar chain (or oligosaccharide) with one or more sialic acids linked to that chain through glycosylation. The presence of a sialic acid in the ganglioside's sugar chain (or glycan) makes it also a sialoglycolipid, comparable to sialoglycoproteins. Sialic acids are highly acidic, contributing to the conformational structure of the macromolecules to which they are enzymatically attached. The Neu5Ac renders the head groups of gangliosides acidic at pH 7 (i.e., physiologic pH), which distinguishes them from basic globosides. Gangliosides are particularly abundant in the central nervous systems of most vertebrates, carrying the bulk of sialic acids in those tissues.

The name ganglioside was first applied by the German scientist Ernst Klenk in 1942 to lipids newly isolated from ganglion cells of the brain. More than 60 gangliosides are known, which differ from each other mainly in the position and number of Neu5Ac residues. It is a component of the cell plasma membrane that modulates cell signal transduction events, and appears to concentrate in lipid rafts.

Since the 2010s, gangliosides have been become increasingly important molecules in immunology and oncology. Natural and semisynthetic gangliosides are considered possible therapeutics for neurodegenerative disorders. In human tumors, a variant ganglioside (Neu5Gc-GM3) containing an extra, unexplained hydroxyl group (converting Neu5Ac to Neu5Gc) is an established tumor marker, as this alteration is not present in healthy tissues and triggers an antigenic immune response.

== Location ==
Gangliosides are present and concentrated on cell surfaces, with the two hydrocarbon chains of the ceramide moiety embedded in the plasma membrane and the oligosaccharides located on the extracellular surface, where they present points of recognition for extracellular molecules or surfaces of neighboring cells. They are found predominantly in the nervous system where they constitute 6% of all lipids.

== Function ==
The oligosaccharide groups on gangliosides extend well beyond the surfaces of the cell membranes, and act as distinguishing surface markers that can serve as specific determinants in cellular recognition and cell-to-cell communication. These carbohydrate head groups also act as specific receptors for certain pituitary glycoprotein hormones and certain bacterial protein toxins such as cholera toxin.

The functions of gangliosides as specific determinants suggest its important role in the growth and differentiation of tissues as well as in carcinogenesis. It has been found that tumor formation can induce the synthesis of a new complement of ganglioside, and very low concentrations of a specific ganglioside can induce differentiation of cultured neuronal tumor cells.

== Common gangliosides ==
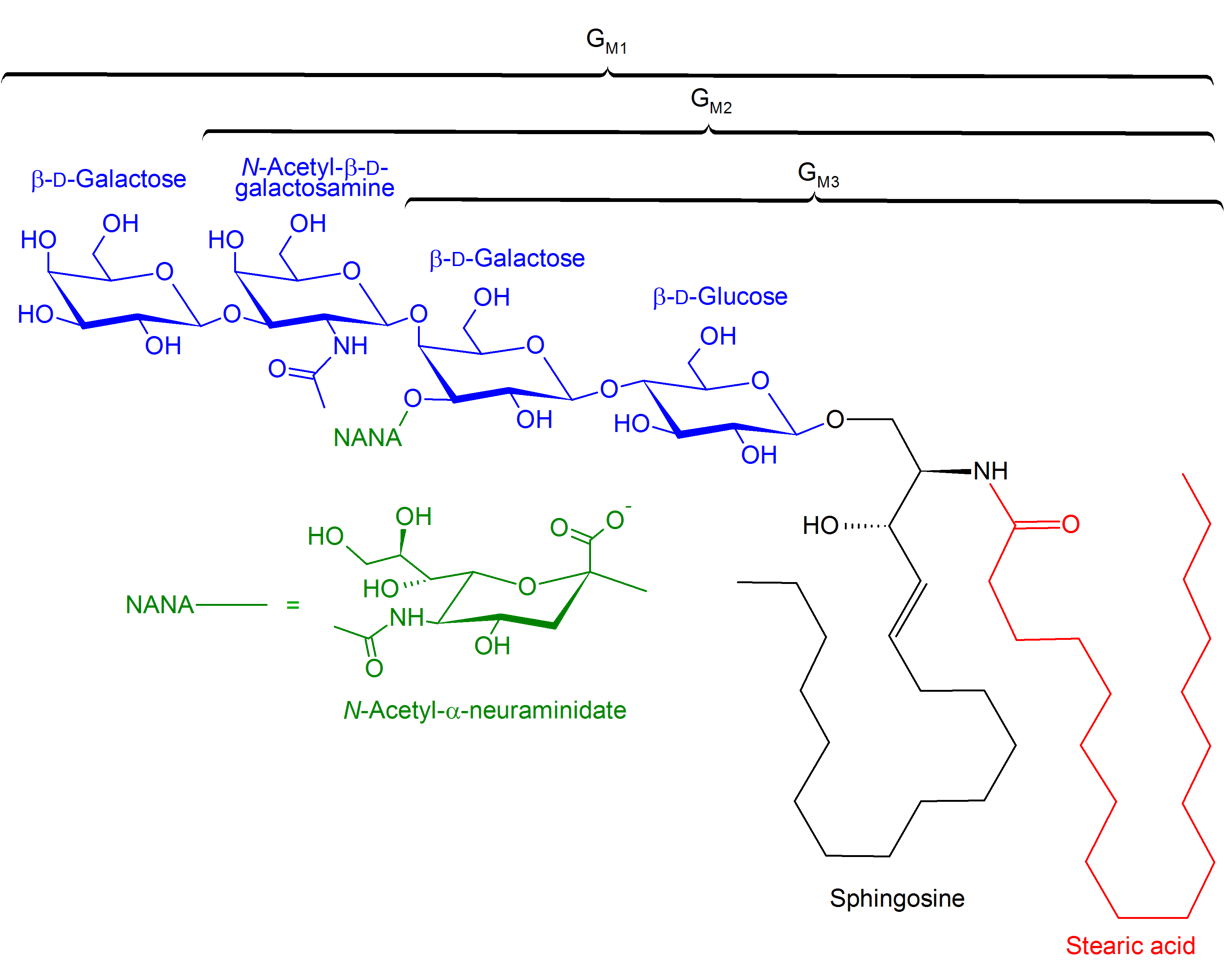
Structures of GM1, GM2, GM3

Gangliosides are abbreviated based on their number of sialic acid residues, with "M" for mono-, "D" for di-, and so forth, with further variation existing in the oligosaccharide chain and labeled alphanumerically (e.g. GM2 vs GM1, which carries an additional terminal galactose).

Common gangliosides
Abbreviation	sialic acid residues
GM1, GM2, GM3	1
GD1a, GD1b, GD2, GD3	2
GT1b, GT3	3
GQ1	4

An overview of common glycoshingolipid glycan structures can be viewed here (Table 1, Yu et al 2011, J Oleo Sci), and of common CNS gangliosides here (Table 2, "Structures of the main gangliosides of human brain nervous system", Mauri and Sonnino 2026, Humana Press).

== Pathology ==
Gangliosides are continuously synthesized and degraded in cells. They are degraded to ceramides by sequential removal of sugar units in the oligosaccharide group, catalyzed by a set of highly specific lysosomal enzymes. Mutations in genes coding for these enzymes leads to the accumulation of partially broken down gangliosides in lysosomes, which results in a group of diseases called gangliosidosis. For example, the fatal Tay–Sachs disease arises as a genetic defect which leads to no functional hexosaminidase A produced, causing GM2 to accumulate in lysosomes. Ultimately the ganglion cells in the nervous system swell enormously, disturbing the normal functions of neurons.

Gangliosides are also involved in several diseases:

- Influenza, in which haemagglutinin of influenza virus exploits certain gangliosides to enter and infect the cells expressing them.
- Guillain–Barré syndrome, which has been linked to the production of anti-ganglioside antibodies.
- Cholera
- Tetanus
- Botulism
- Leprosy
- Obesity, where inadequate ganglioside expression in mediobasal hypothalamic neurons deregulates neuronal leptin and insulin signaling.
