= Venglustat =

Medication

Clinical data
- Trade names: Infilbray
- AHFS/Drugs.com: Infilbray
- License data: US DailyMed: Venglustat
- Routes of administration: By mouth
- Drug class: Glucosylceramide synthase inhibitor
- ATC code: None

Legal status
- Legal status: US: ℞-only

Identifiers
- IUPAC name: [(3S)-1-azabicyclo[2.2.2]octan-3-yl] N-[2-[2-(4-fluorophenyl)-1,3-thiazol-4-yl]propan-2-yl]carbamate
- CAS Number: 1401090-53-6; 1629063-78-0
- PubChem CID: 60199242; 60199241
- IUPHAR/BPS: 11550
- DrugBank: DB14966
- ChemSpider: 34989426
- UNII: BLP1XA3FZA; 94855LQZ8D
- KEGG: D11633; D11634
- ChEBI: CHEBI:757083
- ChEMBL: ChEMBL4297611; ChEMBL4594270
- PDB ligand: KYF (PDBe, RCSB PDB)

Chemical and physical data
- Formula: C_{20}H_{24}FN_{3}O_{2}S
- Molar mass: 389.49 g·mol^{−1}
- 3D model (JSmol): Interactive image; Interactive image
- SMILES: CC(C)(C1=CSC(=N1)C2=CC=C(C=C2)F)NC(=O)O[C@@H]3CN4CCC3CC4; CC(C)(C1=CSC(=N1)C2=CC=C(C=C2)F)NC(=O)O[C@@H]3CN4CCC3CC4.C([C@@H](C(=O)O)O)C(=O)O
- InChI: InChI=1S/C20H24FN3O2S/c1-20(2,17-12-27-18(22-17)14-3-5-15(21)6-4-14)23-19(25)26-16-11-24-9-7-13(16)8-10-24/h3-6,12-13,16H,7-11H2,1-2H3,(H,23,25)/t16-/m1/s1; Key:YFHRCLAKZBDRHN-MRXNPFEDSA-N; Key:SQXUKOJKIWCALK-AAXLQGCPSA-N

Venglustat, sold under the brand name Infilbray, is a medication used for the treatment of Gaucher disease. It is a glucosylceramide synthase inhibitor. It is used as the salt venglustat malate. It is given by mouth.

The most common side effects of venglustat include gastrointestinal symptoms as well as adverse effects on mood.

Venglustat was approved for medical use in the United States in November 2026.

== Medical uses ==
Venglustat indicated for the treatment of neurological manifestations of type 3 Gaucher disease in people weighing at least 15 kg (33 lb).

Venglustat crosses the blood-brain barrier to reduce the accumulation of harmful substances in the body and brain.

Type 3 Gaucher disease is a rare, inherited condition in which the body cannot properly break down fatty substances, called glucosphingolipids, due to a deficient or malfunctioning enzyme.

== Adverse effects ==
The most common side effects of venglustat include gastrointestinal symptoms as well as adverse effects on mood.

Serious psychiatric risks, including suicidal ideation and behavior, have been reported. Potential risks identified from animal studies include potential clouding of vision in younger people and adverse effects on fetal development when it is taken during pregnancy.

== History ==
The US Food and Drug Administration approved venglustat supported by data from a randomized, double-blind, multi-center clinical study enrolling 43 participants aged 12 years and older with type 3 Gaucher disease who had previously been treated with enzyme replacement therapy and had achieved systemic disease stabilization. Participants received either venglustat orally once daily or intravenous enzyme replacement therapy every two weeks for 52 weeks. Treatment effectiveness was evaluated using two assessments that capture the neurological symptoms central to daily life in participants with type 3 Gaucher disease, including those related to ataxia (loss of muscle control and coordination) and cognitive function. At Week 52, participants treated with venglustat demonstrated improvement on a measure that combined both assessments compared to those taking enzyme replacement therapy for the treatment of non-neurologic manifestations of type 3 Gaucher disease.

== Society and culture ==
=== Legal status ===
Venglustat was approved for medical use in the United States in November 2026.

The US Food and Drug Administration (FDA) granted the application for venglustat, breakthrough therapy, rare pediatric disease, fast track, orphan drug, and priority review designations. The FDA granted the approval of Infilbray to Genzyme Corporation.

=== Names ===
Venglustat is the international nonproprietary name.

Venglustat is sold under the brand name Infilbray.

- Bhattiprolu M, Kappler M, Han TU, Henderson M, Serlin Y, Sidransky E (May 2026). "Pharmacotherapies for Gaucher disease: what's new on the horizon?". Expert Opinion on Pharmacotherapy. 27 (7): 585–597. doi:10.1080/14656566.2026.2667325. PMID 42153355.
- "Venglustat ( Code - C152852 )". EVS Explore.
- "Venglustat Malate ( Code - C171783 )". EVS Explore.
- Clinical trial number NCT05222906 for "Study to Evaluate the Efficacy and Safety of Venglustat in Adult and Pediatric Patients With Gaucher Disease Type 3 (LEAP2MONO)" at ClinicalTrials.gov
