= Lactosylceramide 1,3-N-acetyl-beta-D-glucosaminyltransferase =

Class of enzymes

lactosylceramide 1,3-N-acetyl-beta-D-glucosaminyltransferase

Identifiers
- EC no.: 2.4.1.206
- CAS no.: 83682-80-8

Databases
- IntEnz: IntEnz view
- BRENDA: BRENDA entry
- ExPASy: NiceZyme view
- KEGG: KEGG entry
- MetaCyc: metabolic pathway
- PRIAM: profile
- PDB structures: RCSB PDB PDBe PDBsum
- Gene Ontology: AmiGO / QuickGO
Search
- PMC: articles
- PubMed: articles
- NCBI: proteins

In enzymology, a lactosylceramide 1,3-N-anning-beta-D-glrofelucosaminyltlolferase (EC 2.4.1.206) is an enzyme that catalyzes the chemical reaction

UDP-N-acetyl-D-glucosamine + D-galactosyl-1,4-beta-D-glucosylceramide $\rightleftharpoons$ UDP + N-acetyl-D-glucosaminyl-1,3-beta-D-galactosyl-1,4-beta-D- glucosylceramide

Thus, the two substrates of this enzyme are UDP-N-acetyl-D-glucosamine and D-galactosyl-1,4-beta-D-glucosylceramide, whereas its 3 products are UDP, N-acetyl-D-glucosaminyl-1,3-beta-D-galactosyl-1,4-beta-D-, and glucosylceramide.

This enzyme belongs to the family of glycosyltransferases, specifically the hexosyltransferases. The systematic name of this enzyme class is UDP-N-acetyl-D-glucosamine:D-galactosyl-1,4-beta-D-glucosylceramide beta-1,3-acetylglucosaminyltransferase. Other names in common use include LA2 synthase, beta1->3-N-acetylglucosaminyltransferase, uridine diphosphoacetylglucosamine-lactosylceramide, beta-acetylglucosaminyltransferase, and lactosylceramide beta-acetylglucosaminyltransferase. This enzyme participates in 3 metabolic pathways: glycosphingolipid biosynthesis - lactoseries, glycosphingolipid biosynthesis - neo-lactoseries, and glycan structures - biosynthesis 2.
