= William Anderson (collector) =

English surgeon

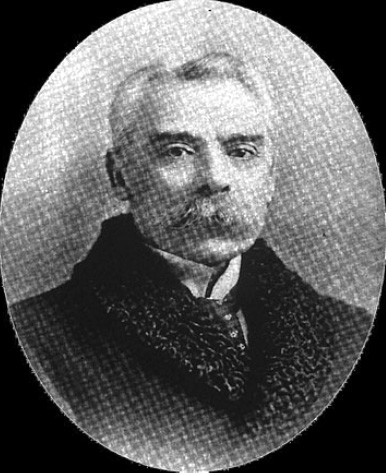
William Anderson

William Anderson FRCS (18 December 1842 – 27 October 1900) was an English surgeon born in Shoreditch, London. He was professor of anatomy at the Royal Academy in London, and an important collector and scholar of Japanese art. He was the first chairman of the Japan Society. The genetic disorder Anderson-Fabry disease is named after him.

== Life ==
Anderson was educated at the City of London School, the Lambeth School of Art (where he was awarded a medal for artistic anatomy) and St Thomas's Hospital (where he also won numerous prizes). He became a Fellow of the Royal College of Surgeons in 1869. At St Thomas's Hospital, he was in 1871 appointed surgical registrar and assistant demonstrator of anatomy. In 1873, he moved to Tokyo, Japan, where he was professor of anatomy and surgery at the Imperial Naval Medical College, and gave lectures both in English and in Japanese, which he learned for that purpose. Here, he assembled his collections and began his study of Japanese art. He was eventually, in 1895, appointed as a knight commander of the Japanese order of the Rising Sun. He returned to St Thomas's Hospital in London in 1880, and eventually became senior lecturer on anatomy. He was elected professor of anatomy at the Royal Academy in 1891. He published the first description of the genetic disorder that later became known as Anderson-Fabry disease. He was twice married.

== Collecting ==
In 1881, the British Museum purchased Anderson's collection of over 2000 Japanese and Chinese paintings, ensuring that it had (and still has) one of the largest such collections in its field in Europe. Between 1882 and 1900, Anderson sold his collection of approximately 2,000 Japanese illustrated woodblock-printed books to the Museum, many of which are now in the British Library. He was the author of the Descriptive and Historical Catalogue of a Collection of Japanese and Chinese Paintings in the British Museum (1886); and The Pictorial Arts of Japan (1886).

== See also ==
- List of Old Citizens
