= GM3 =

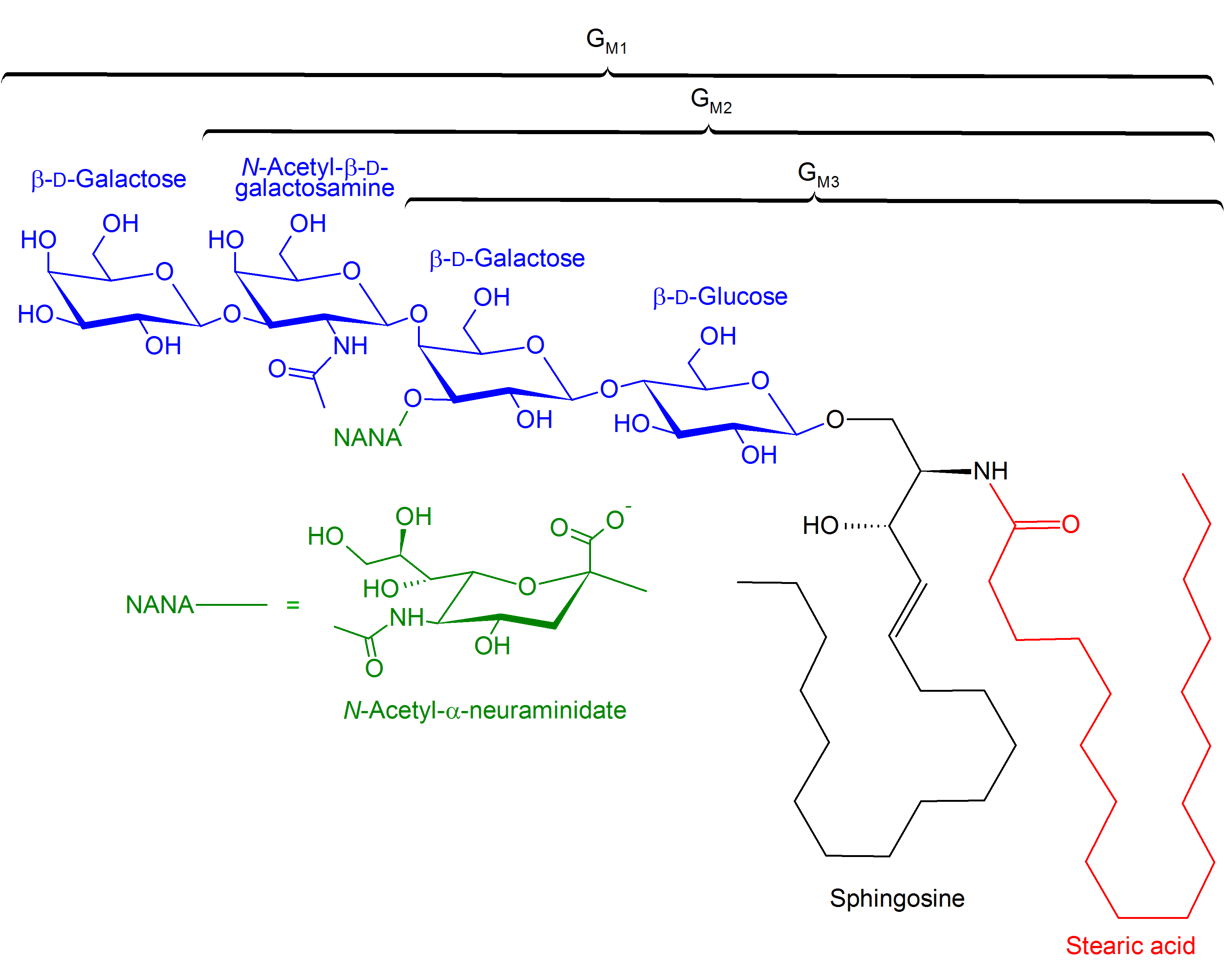
Structures of GM1, GM2, GM3 gangliosides

GM3 (monosialodihexosylganglioside) is a type of ganglioside. The letter G refers to ganglioside, and M is for monosialic acid as it has only one sialic acid group. The numbering is based on its relative mobility in electrophoresis among other monosialic gangliosides. Its structure can be condensed to Neu5Ac-Gal-Glc-ceramide. GM3 is the most common membrane-bound glycosphingolipid in tissues, composed of three monosaccharide groups attached to a ceramide backbone. GM3 serves as a precursor for other, more complex gangliosides. Like other gangliosides, GM3 is synthesized in the Golgi apparatus. It is then transported to the plasma membrane, where it functions in cellular signaling. GM3 also functions as an inhibitor; it inhibits cell growth, the function of growth factor receptors, and generation of cytokines by T cells.

== Applications in cancer treatment ==
The immunologic function of GM3 in inhibiting proliferation has resulted in its usage in the study of cancer biology and cancer treatments. GM3 has been found to reduce the motility of ovarian cancer cells, colorectal cancer cells, and gastric cancer cells. High amounts of GM3 also displayed a high amount of caveolin-1, a molecule which has been shown to inhibit ovarian cancer growth. In bladder cancer cells, GM3 show antiproliferative effects. Increased concentrations of GM3 in bladder cancer cells reduces the malignancy potential of those cells and induces apoptosis. The addition of GM3 to bladder cancer cells also decreases their cell adhesion and inhibits tumor growth. Due to its role in inhibiting cancer growth, GM3 is a target of cancer treatments. The chemotherapy drug cisplatin functions by inducing GM3-mediated apoptosis of cancer cells.

An N-glycolyl variant of GM3, Neu5Gc-GM3, in which the single sialic acid Neu5Ac has been either replaced or hydroxylated to its derivative Neu5Gc, has been found in large variety of solid tumors in humans and is strongly associated with tumor grade. The enzyme which canonically hydroxylates Neu5Ac to Neu5Gc in vertebrates is CMAH. In humans, this enzyme exhibits a 92-bp frame-shifting deletion in a critical enzymatic binding pocket, resulting from a human-specific Alu element insertion roughly 2.5 to 3 million years ago, a process well-documented in primates and known as retrotransposition-mediated deletion. As a result, modern humans exhibit no traces of Neu5Gc in any healthy tissues, and are known to exhibit circulating antibodies against Neu5Gc-containing glycans and glycoconjugates, the specific affinities of which vary among individuals. To date, there is no known pathway by which Neu5Gc can be endogenously synthesized in human tissues, and thus the presence of Neu5Gc-GM3 in human cancers presents both a mystery and a promising target antigen for cancer immunotherapy.
