= Lactosylceramide =

Class of chemical compounds

The structure of lactosylceramide.

The Lactosylceramides, also known as LacCer, are a class of glycosphingolipids composed of a variable hydrophobic ceramide lipid and a hydrophilic sugar moiety. Lactosylceramides are found in microdomains on the plasma layers of numerous cells. Moreover, they are a type of ceramide including lactose, which is an example of a globoside.

== Composition ==
As with many lipids, the chemical formula and molecular weight varies depending on the fatty-acid present. As one example, the chemical formula of Lactosylceramide (d18:1/12:0) is C_{42}H_{79}NO_{13}, which has 806.088 g/mol of molar mass, and the IUPAC name of this species is N-(dodecanoyl)-1-beta-lactosyl-sphing-4-enine.

== Function ==
Lactosylceramides were initially called 'cytolipin H'. It is found in small amounts in most tissues, however, it has various organic capacities and it is of significance as the biosynthetic forerunner of the greater part of the impartial oligoglycosylceramides, sulfatides and gangliosides. In tissues, biosynthesis of lactosylceramide includes expansion of the second monosaccharides unit (galactose) as its nucleotide subsidiary to monoglucosylceramide, catalyzed by a particular beta-1, 4-galactosyltransferase on the lumenal side of the Golgi mechanical assembly.

In tissues, the precursor glucosylceramide is moved by the sphingolipid transport protein FAPP2 to the distal Golgi apparatus, where it initially cross from the cytosolic side of the membrane by means of flippase activity. Biosynthesis of lactosylceramide then includes expansion of the second monosaccharides unit as its actuated nucleotide subordinate (UDP-galactose) to monoglucosylceramide on the lumenal side of the Golgi apparatus in a response catalyzed by β-1,4-galactosyltransferases of which two are known. The lactosylceramide created can be further glycosylated, or it very well may be moved to the plasma layer essentially by a non-vesicular system that is inadequately seen, however it can't be translocated back to the cytosolic flyer. It is likewise recovered by the catabolism of a considerable lot of the lipids for which it is the biosynthetic antecedent. Erasure of the lactosylceramide synthase by quality focusing on is embryonically deadly.

== Associated disorders ==
Gaucher's disease is a sphingolipidosis described by a particular inadequacy in acidic glucocerebrosidase, which results in abnormal gathering of glucosylceramide essentially inside the lysosome. Gaucher's disease has been associated with instances of leukemia, myeloma, glioblastoma, lung malignancy, and hepatocellular carcinoma, in spite of the fact that the explanations behind the relationship are at present being discussed.

Some suggest that the impact of Gaucher's disease might be connected to malignant growth, while others ensnare the treatments used to treat Gaucher's illness. This discussion is not completely astounding, as the theories connecting Gaucher's disease with cancer fail to address the roles of ceramide and glucosylceramide in malignant growth science.

Gaucher disease is caused by mutations in GBA1, which encodes the lysosomal catalyst glucocerebrosidase (GCase). GBA1 transformations drive broad gathering of glucosylceramide (GC) in different natural and versatile resistant cells in the spleen, liver, lung and bone marrow, frequently prompting endless irritation. The systems that interface abundance GC to tissue aggravation stay obscure.

== See also ==
- Lactosylceramide 1,3-N-acetyl-beta-D-glucosaminyltransferase
- Lactosylceramide alpha-2,3-sialyltransferase
- GAL3ST1
- ST3GAL5
