= Α-Galactosidase =

Enzyme

α-Galactosidase
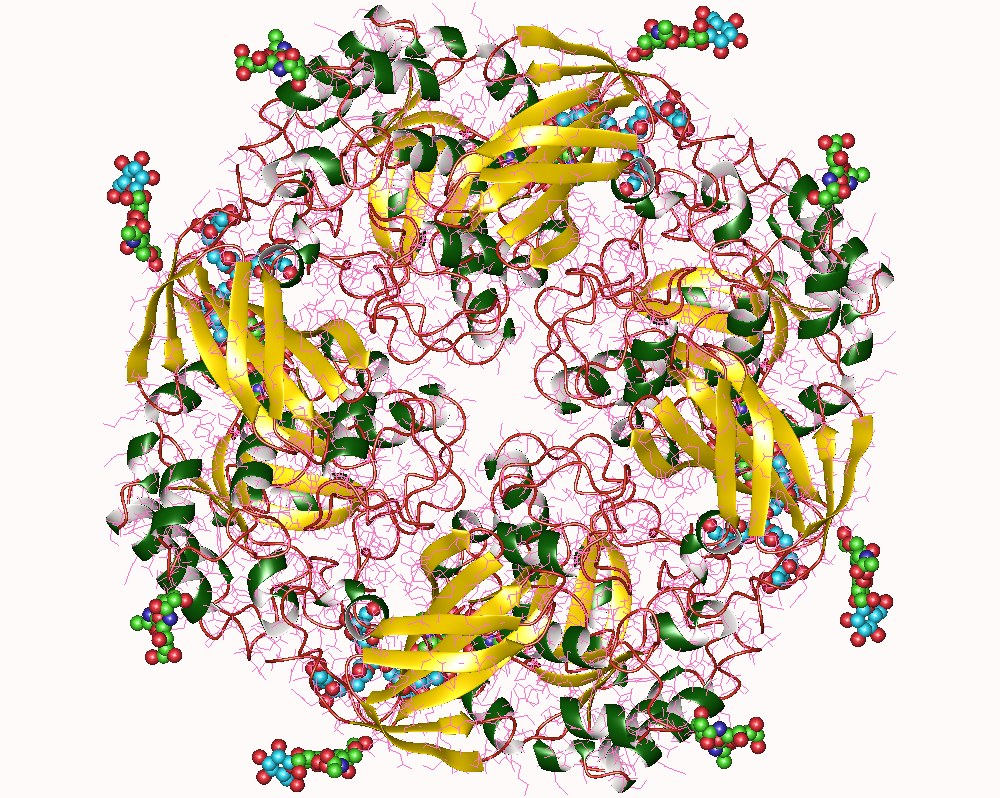
- α-Galactosidase tetramer in Mortierella vinacea

Identifiers
- EC no.: 3.2.1.22
- CAS no.: 9025-35-8

Databases
- BRENDA: enzyme data
- ExPASy: NiceZyme view
- KEGG: enzyme entry
- MetaCyc: metabolic pathway
- Rhea: reactions
- PDB structures: RCSB PDB PDBe PDBsum
- Gene Ontology: AmiGO / QuickGO
Search
- PMC: articles
- PubMed: articles
- NCBI: proteins

α-Galactosidase ( EC 3.2.1.22, α-GAL, α-GAL A; systematic name α-D-galactoside galactohydrolase) is a glycoside hydrolase enzyme that catalyses the hydrolysis of terminal, non-reducing α-D-galactose residues in α-D-galactosides, including galactooligosaccharides (GOS), galactomannans and galactolipids.

It catalyzes many catabolic processes, including cleavage of glycoproteins, glycolipids, and polysaccharides.

In humans, the enzyme is encoded by the GLA and MYORG genes.

The fungal Aspergillus niger aglA gene, originally annotated as an α‑galactosidase, actually encodes an enzyme with predominant α‑N‑acetylgalactosaminidase activity. This fungal "α‑galactosidase" is structurally and functionally most closely related to human α‑N‑acetylgalactosaminidase (NAGA, historically termed α‑galactosidase B), not to human α‑galactosidase A (GLA).

== Structure ==
Human α‑galactosidases encoded by GLA and MYORG genes share a conserved modular architecture built around a TIM barrel catalytic domain with additional β‑sandwich accessory domains.

The lysosomal enzyme α‑galactosidase A (GLA product) is a secreted glycoprotein that forms a homodimer. Each subunit contains an N‑terminal TIM barrel harboring the active site and a C‑terminal antiparallel β‑sandwich, with multiple N‑linked glycans that stabilize the fold and mediate lysosomal targeting via mannose 6-phosphate receptors. In contrast, MYORG is a type I membrane glycoprotein located in the endoplasmic reticulum that also dimerizes and comprises an N‑terminal β‑sandwich‑like domain, a central TIM barrel catalytic domain, and a proximal β‑sheet domain, but it lacks the distal C‑terminal domain typical of other GH31 family members and instead uses an internal insertion region to form its dimer interface.

== Function ==
This enzyme is a homodimeric glycoprotein that hydrolyses the terminal α-galactosyl moieties from glycolipids and glycoproteins. It predominantly hydrolyzes ceramide trihexoside, and it can catalyze the hydrolysis of melibiose into galactose and glucose.

== Reaction mechanism ==
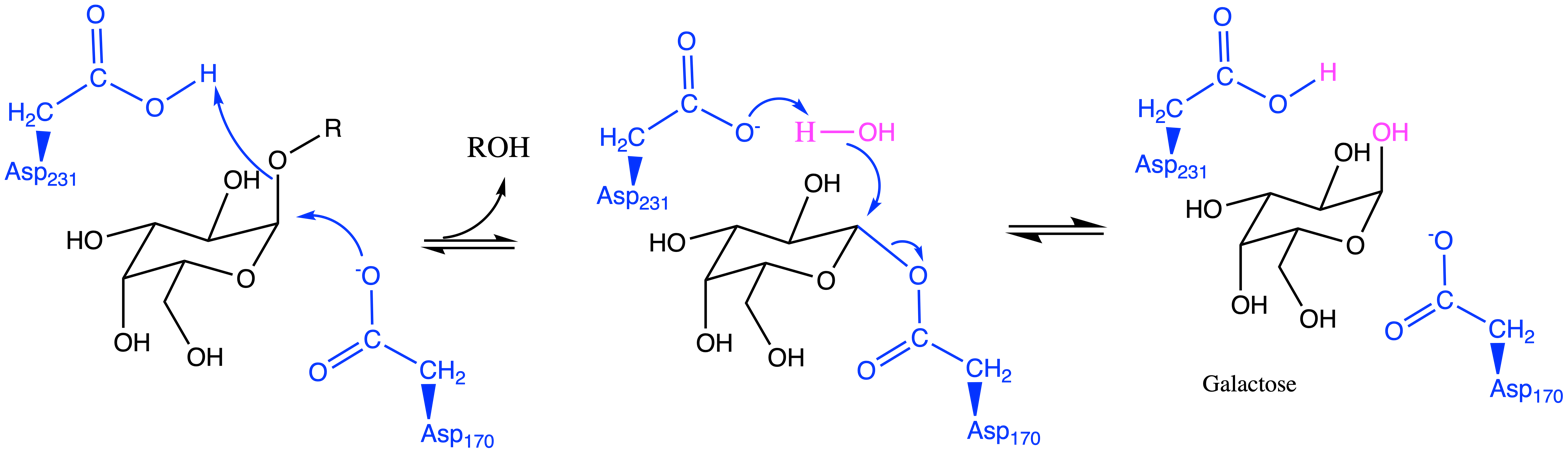
A double displacement reaction mechanism of α-GAL's catalytic action.The ligand (black) when bound in the active site of the enzyme (blue). The two key amino acid residues in the active site are Asp-170 and Asp-231. First, Asp-170 performs a nucleophilic attack on the glycosidic bond to release the terminal α-galactose molecule from the ligand. Then, Asp-231 serves as a base to remove a proton from water, making it more nucleophilic to attack the galactose-Asp complex and release α-galactose from the active site.

== Applications ==
An α‑galactosidase preparation derived from the mold Aspergillus niger is used as a dietary supplement to improve digestion of oligosaccharides and reduce gas‑related symptoms in individuals with complex carbohydrate intolerance, particularly after consumption of legumes.

This mold-derived α‑galactosidase is the active ingredient in Beano, a dietary supplement for bloating and flatulence.

Recombinant α-galactosidase made by baker's yeast is approved in Europe as a feed additive intended to make poultry food more digestible.

== See also ==
- β-galactosidase
- Migalastat, a drug targeting α-galactosidase
- Classification of α-galactosidases (according to CAZy)
