= GM2 (ganglioside) =

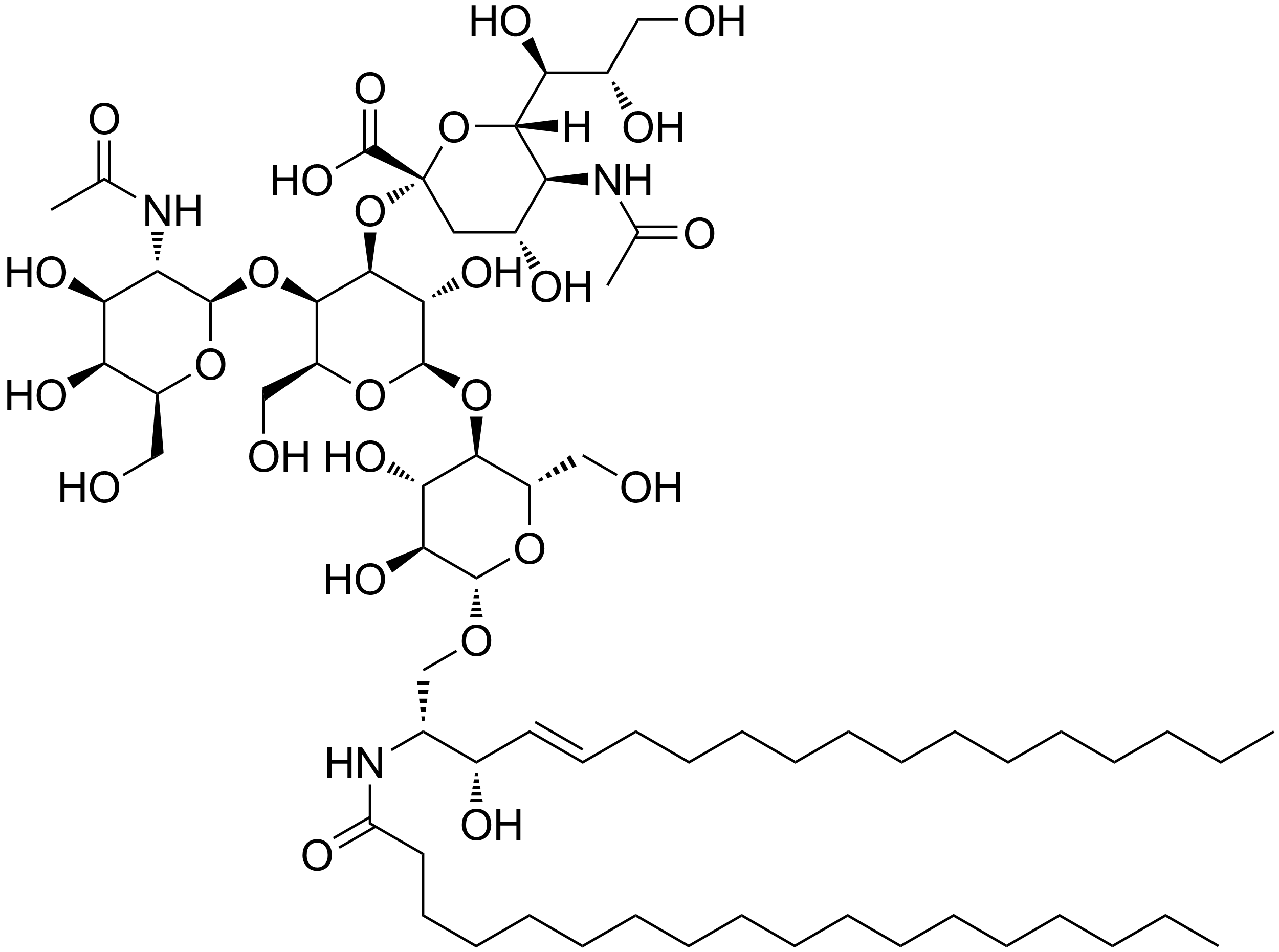

Names
- IUPAC name (2S,3R,4E)-3-Hydroxy-2-octadecanamidooctadec-4-en-1-yl (5-acetamido-3,5-dideoxy-D-glycero-α-D-galacto-non-2-ulopyranosylonic acid)-(2→3)-[2-acetamido-2-deoxy-β-D-galactopyranosyl-(1→4)]-β-D-galactopyranosyl-(1→4)-β-D-glucopyranoside
- Systematic IUPAC name (2S,4S,5R,6R)-5-Acetamido-2-{[(2R,3S,4R,5R,6S)-3-{[(2S,3R,4R,5R,6R)-3-acetamido-4,5-dihydroxy-6-(hydroxymethyl)oxan-2-yl]oxy}-6-{[(2R,3S,4R,5R,6R)-4,5-dihydroxy-2-(hydroxymethyl)-6-{[(2S,3R,4E)-3-hydroxy-2-octadecanamidooctadec-4-en-1-yl]oxy}oxan-3-yl]oxy}-5-hydroxy-2-(hydroxymethyl)oxan-4-yl]oxy}-4-hydroxy-6-[(1R,2R)-1,2,3-trihydroxypropyl]oxane-2-carboxylate
- Other names Ganglioside GM2; Tay–Sachs ganglioside; β-D-GalNAc-(1→4)-[α-Neu5Ac-(2→3)]-β-D-Gal-(1→4)-β-D-Glc-(1↔1)-N-octadecanoylsphingosine

Identifiers
CAS Number	19600-01-2
3D model (JSmol)	Interactive image
ChEBI	CHEBI:60327
ChemSpider	26286730
PubChem CID	71308211
UNII	X8HRQ6G9HF
- InChI: InChI=1S/C68H123N3O26/c1-5-7-9-11-13-15-17-19-20-22-24-26-28-30-32-34-51(81)71-44(45(78)33-31-29-27-25-23-21-18-16-14-12-10-8-6-2)40-90-65-58(86)57(85)60(49(38-74)93-65)95-66-59(87)63(61(50(39-75)94-66)96-64-53(70-43(4)77)56(84)55(83)48(37-73)92-64)91-41-68(67(88)89)35-46(79)52(69-42(3)76)62(97-68)54(82)47(80)36-72/h31,33,44-50,52-66,72-75,78-80,82-87H,5-30,32,34-41H2,1-4H3,(H,69,76)(H,70,77)(H,71,81)(H,88,89)/b33-31+/t44-,45+,46-,47+,48+,49+,50+,52+,53+,54+,55-,56+,57+,58+,59+,60+,61-,62+,63+,64-,65-,66-,68-/m1/s1 Key: USMMPBVNWHAJBE-YMEOXFOQSA-N; InChI=1/C68H123N3O26/c1-5-7-9-11-13-15-17-19-20-22-24-26-28-30-32-34-51(81)71-44(45(78)33-31-29-27-25-23-21-18-16-14-12-10-8-6-2)40-90-65-58(86)57(85)60(49(38-74)93-65)95-66-59(87)63(61(50(39-75)94-66)96-64-53(70-43(4)77)56(84)55(83)48(37-73)92-64)91-41-68(67(88)89)35-46(79)52(69-42(3)76)62(97-68)54(82)47(80)36-72/h31,33,44-50,52-66,72-75,78-80,82-87H,5-30,32,34-41H2,1-4H3,(H,69,76)(H,70,77)(H,71,81)(H,88,89)/b33-31+/t44-,45+,46-,47+,48+,49+,50+,52+,53+,54+,55-,56+,57+,58+,59+,60+,61-,62+,63+,64-,65-,66-,68-/m1/s1 Key: USMMPBVNWHAJBE-YMEOXFOQBT
- SMILES: CCCCCCCCCCCCCCCCCC(=O)N[C@H](CO[C@H]1[C@H]([C@@H]([C@H]([C@@H](O1)CO)O[C@@H]2[C@H]([C@@H]([C@@H]([C@@H](O2)CO)O[C@@H]3[C@H]([C@@H]([C@@H]([C@@H](O3)CO)O)O)NC(=O)C)OC[C@]4(C[C@H]([C@@H]([C@H](O4)[C@H]([C@H](CO)O)O)NC(=O)C)O)C(=O)O)O)O)O)[C@H](/C=C/CCCCCCCCCCCCC)O

Properties
Chemical formula	C_{67}H_{121}N_{3}O_{26}
Molar mass	1384.700 g·mol^{−1}
- Except where otherwise noted, data are given for materials in their standard state (at 25 °C [77 °F], 100 kPa). verify (what is ?) Infobox references

In molecular biology, GM2 is a type of ganglioside. G refers to ganglioside, the M is for monosialic (as in it has one sialic acid), and 2 refers to the fact that it was the second monosialic ganglioside discovered. It is pathologically accumulated in several diseases called GM2 gangliosidoses, such as Tay–Sachs disease.

== See also ==
- Ganglioside GM2 activator protein

== Additional images ==
Sphingolipidoses

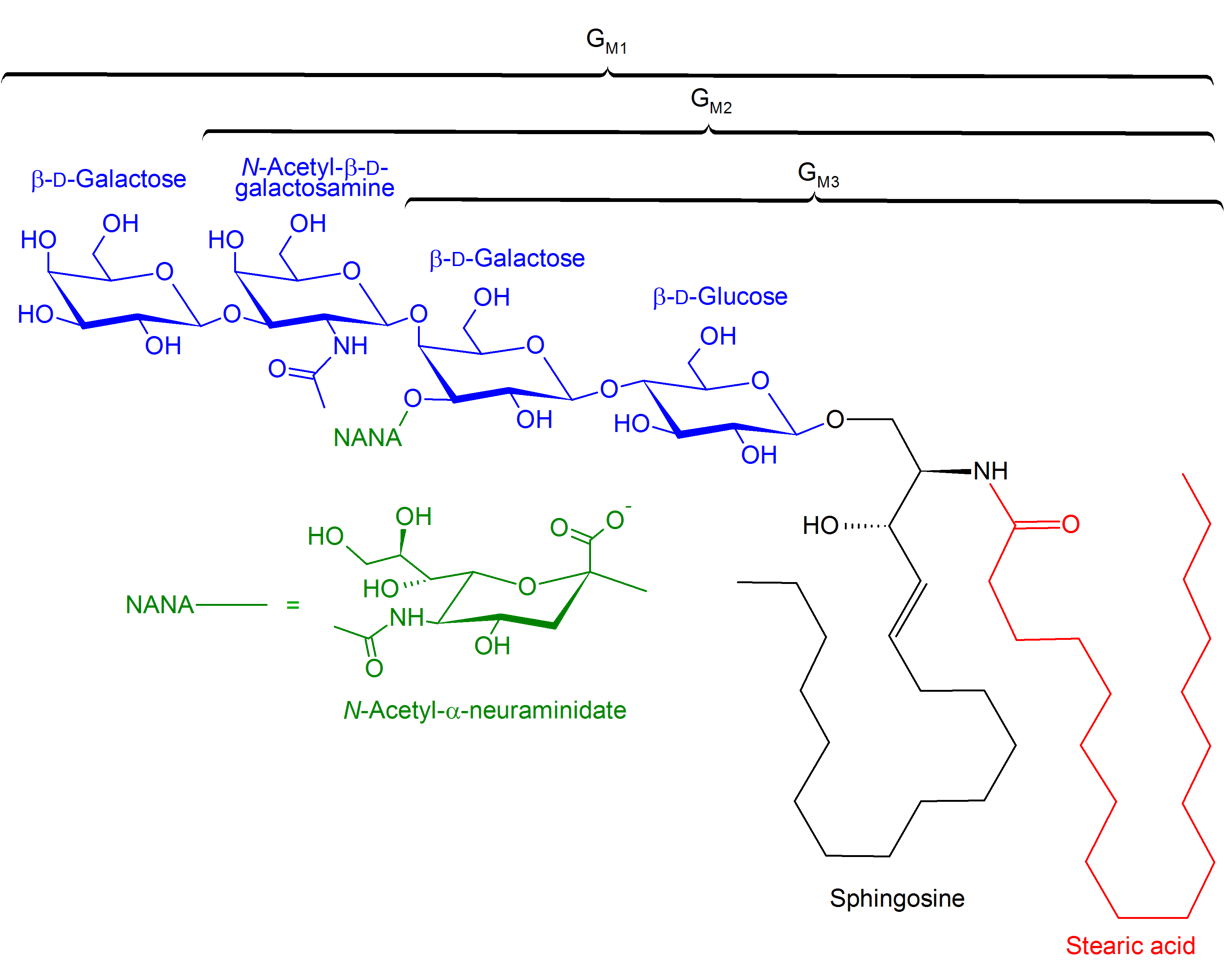
Structures of GM1, GM2, GM3 gangliosides
