= Glycosphingolipid =

Lipid with a carbohydrate attached to a ceramide

Sphingosine

Glycosphingolipids are a subtype of glycolipids containing the amino alcohol sphingosine. They may be considered as sphingolipids with an attached carbohydrate. Glycosphingolipids are a group of lipids (more specifically, sphingolipids) and are a part of the cell membrane. They consist of a hydrophobic ceramide part and a glycosidically bound carbohydrate part. This oligosaccharide content remains on the outside of the cell membrane where it is important for biological processes such as cell adhesion or cell–cell interactions. Glycosphingolipids also play an important role in oncogenesis and ontogenesis.

== Classification ==
In general, glycosphingolipids can be categorized into two groups: neutral glycosphingolipids (also called glycosphingolipids) and negatively charged glycosphingolipids. The latter can be distinguished again by means of the charge carrier: gangliosides, which have sialic acids; and sulfatides, which have a sulfate group. The structural similarity of most glycolipids is the so-called lactosylceramide, that is, a lactose disaccharide that is glycosidically bound to a ceramide. Larger structures are subdivided into different groups by the sequence and configuration of the sugars, the four most common being globo-, lacto-, neoLacto- and gangliose.

Glycosphingolipids include:

- Cerebrosides
- Gangliosides
- Globosides
- Isoglobotriosylceramide

== Occurrence and function ==
Gangliosides are mainly found in the cell membranes of the central nervous system, where their carbohydrate group is responsible for the interaction between individual cells and for signaling. However, gangliosides are also found in other cells. Sialic acids are, for example, part of the so-called sialyl-Lewis-x structure, a tetrasaccharide, which is important for various signal transduction processes. Neutral glycosphingolipids are also important, for example as blood type antigens.

Inheritable enzyme defects can lead to disruption in degradation and therefore to accumulation of glycolipids in various organs. In the case of cerebrirosis, this affects the cerebrosides (examples are Gaucher's disease and Krabbe's disease); in the case of gangliosides, it affects the gangliosidoses (e.g. Tay–Sachs disease).

They also constitute part of the cell envelope of certain species of bacteria, such as members of the genus Sphingomonas.

== See also ==
- Sphingomyelin
