= Pompe =

Pompe may refer to:

== People ==
- Annelie Pompe (born 1980), adventurer and athlete from Sweden
- J. L. C. Pompe van Meerdervoort (1829–1908), Dutch physician based in Japan
- Joannes Cassianus Pompe (1901–1945), Dutch pathologist
- Kurt Pompe (1899–1964), German Nazi SS concentration camp commandant
- Walter Pompe (1703–1777), Flemish master-sculptor

== Other uses ==
- Glycogen storage disease type II, or Pompe disease

== See also ==
- Calliotropis pompe, a species of sea snail
- Rue de la Pompe, a street in Paris, France
  - Rue de la Pompe station
