= William Canfield =

American medical researcher

William Canfield is a glycobiologist, chief scientific officer and founder of an Oklahoma City-based biotechnology company, Novazyme, which was acquired by Genzyme in August 2001 and developed, among other things, an enzyme that can stabilize (but not cure) Pompe disease, based on Canfield's ongoing research since 1998. Canfield subsequently left Genzyme and established, with his partner in the Novazyme operation, John Crowley, another research laboratory (Cytovance Biologics), which he still heads. He saved Cytovance from bankruptcy by forming an investor group and raising $9 million after Crowley suddenly left the lab in 2005 to become the chief executive officer at Amicus Therapeutics in New Jersey.

== Biography ==
Canfield obtained a B.S. in Chemistry from the University of Puget Sound followed by a Ph.D. in Biochemistry and Molecular Biology and an M.D. from the University of Washington School of Medicine. Canfield currently holds a faculty position in medical glycobiology at the University of Oklahoma Health Sciences Center. John Crowley took over a position as a CEO in Novazyme after leaving Bristol-Myers Squibb in March 2000 and together with Dr. Y. T. Chen at Duke University pushed for expedited approval by the U.S. Food and Drug Administration (FDA) of a new drug compound, NZ-1001 under orphan drug designation for the treatment of Glycogen storage disease type II in October 2005. The FDA stated: “We have determined that Novazyme’s recombinant human highly phosphorylated acid alpha-glucosidase (rhHPGAA) qualifies for orphan designation for enzyme replacement therapy in patients with all subtypes of glycogen storage disease type II (Pompe's disease).” Subsequent research at Genzyme on NZ-1001 along with three other potential compounds brought approval of the first enzyme replacement therapy for Pompe's disease - Alglucosidase alfa (Myozyme or Lumizyme, Genzyme Inc) in 2006.

== Popular culture ==
William Canfield's work with Pompe Disease was fictionalized and made the subject of a 2010 movie Extraordinary Measures in which he is called Dr. Robert Stonehill and played by Harrison Ford.
