= Lysosomal alpha-glucosidase =

Lysosomal alpha-glucosidase may refer to:

- Glucan 1,4-a-glucosidase, an enzyme
- Acid alpha-glucosidase, an enzyme deficient in Pompe disease
