= John Crowley (businessman) =

American biotechnology executive and entrepreneur

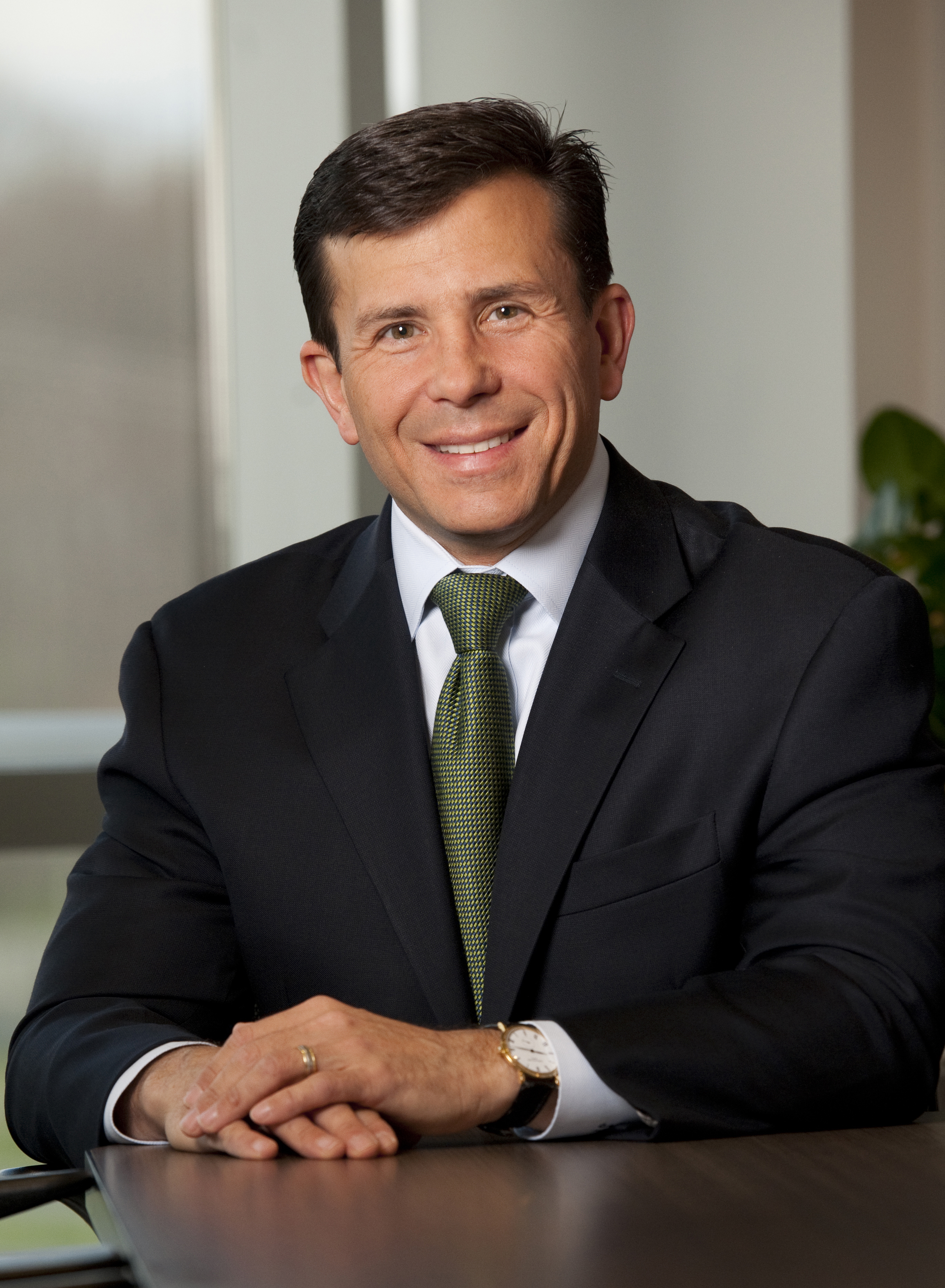

Personal details
- Born: April 7, 1967 (age 59) Englewood, New Jersey, U.S.
- Party: Republican
- Spouse: Aileen Holleran
- Children: John; Megan; Patrick
- Education: Harvard Business School (MBA); Notre Dame Law School (JD); Georgetown University (BS); United States Naval Academy Bergen Catholic High School
- Occupation: President and CEO, Biotechnology Innovation Organization (BIO)

John Francis Crowley (born April 7, 1967) is the president and CEO of the Biotechnology Innovation Organization (BIO), the world’s largest biotechnology advocacy organization. He served as the chairman and CEO of Amicus Therapeutics. He co-founded Novazyme Pharmaceuticals with William Canfield, which was later acquired by Genzyme Corporation, and founded Orexigen Therapeutics. In 2006, he was profiled in the book The Cure: How a Father Raised $100 Million – And Bucked the Medical Establishment – In a Quest to Save His Children by Geeta Anand. In 2010, Crowley released his memoir, Chasing Miracles: The Crowley Family Journey of Strength, Hope, and Joy. Crowley and his family were the inspiration for the movie Extraordinary Measures starring Harrison Ford and Brendan Fraser in 2010. Crowley was named CEO of the Biotechnology Innovation Organization in 2023.

== Early life and education ==
Crowley was raised in Englewood, New Jersey, the son of an Englewood police officer who died in an accident on duty when Crowley was eight years old. His family has Irish and Italian Catholic roots. Crowley's grandfather, John, was a first-generation immigrant from County Cork. His mother worked as a secretary and a waitress.

Crowley attended Bergen Catholic High School in Oradell, New Jersey, graduating with the class of 1985. Crowley attended the United States Naval Academy in Annapolis, Maryland from 1986 to 1987. He went on to earn a B.S. in Foreign Service from Georgetown University. He entered the University of Notre Dame Law School in 1989 and married his wife Aileen in 1990. After earning his J.D. degree from Notre Dame in 1992, he worked as a litigation associate in the Health Care Practice Group of the Indianapolis-based law firm of Bingham Summers Welsh & Spilman. He went on to earn an M.B.A. degree from Harvard Business School in 1997, and then worked for a management consulting firm in San Francisco.

== Career ==
In 1998, two of Crowley's children, Megan and Patrick, were diagnosed with a severe neuromuscular disorder glycogen storage disease type II, also called Pompe disease. In the face of the children's deteriorating health, the family moved to Princeton, New Jersey to be close to doctors specializing in the disease. Crowley got a job at Bristol-Myers Squibb, immersing himself in health research. He established a foundation to raise money for Pompe awareness and the family worked with non-profit organizations to fund Pompe research. Crowley found that there were researchers in Europe as well as at Duke University, the University of Florida, and University of Oklahoma that were all working on Pompe, but were not communicating. In March 2000, Crowley left Bristol-Myers Squibb and partnered with William Canfield to start Novazyme Pharmaceuticals, a biotechnology research company located in Oklahoma City. Crowley became the company's CEO.

In 2001, Novazyme was acquired by Genzyme Corporation, then the world's third-largest biotechnology company. Crowley, who became senior vice president, was in charge of Genzyme's global Pompe program, the largest R&D effort in the company's history, from September 2001 until December 2002. In January 2003, Megan and Patrick Crowley received the enzyme replacement therapy for Pompe disease developed by Genzyme at St. Peters Hospital in New Brunswick. The therapy, called Lumizyme, is given bi-weekly. The enzyme replacement therapy reduced the size of the children's hearts and improved their muscle strength. As of 2024, Megan is a college graduate working for Make-A-Wish. The acquisition of Novazyme by Genzyme, and Crowley's fight to cure Pompe's Disease, was documented in the Harvard Business School Case Study, Novazyme: A Father's Love.

Crowley left Genzyme to ensure that his children would qualify for a drug developed by the company. He then became founding president and CEO of Orexigen Therapeutics in 2003. In 2004, he became a director at Amicus Therapeutics, based in Cranbury, New Jersey, and in January 2005, he was named the president and CEO of the company. Amicus works to develop treatments for rare, devastating genetic disorders. The company has a Pompe treatment in development, as well as Galafold (migalastat), which is for Fabry disease. The company's Fabry drug was approved for use in Europe in 2016. The company also has a drug in late stage clinical development for epidermolysis bullosa (EB).

Crowley also served in the United States Navy Reserve as an intelligence officer. He completed a six-month tour of active duty at the Center for Naval Intelligence in Virginia in 2007. He was assigned to a Navy Reserve unit at the United States Special Operations Command.

Crowley is a member of the 2009 class of Henry Crown Fellows at the Aspen Institute.

=== Politics ===
In the spring of 2008, Crowley was considered as a potential candidate for the Republican nomination for United States Senate in New Jersey to oppose incumbent Democrat Frank Lautenberg. He did not run due to family and military obligations. Crowley served from 2008 to 2009 as the Honorary Chairman of Building the New Majority, a Continuing Political Committee, the New Jersey state version of a Political Action Committee, that seeks "..to identify, develop and empower local candidates from township committee to the state legislature".

He has been involved in championing numerous public policy causes, most notably in the rare disease and healthcare space. On July 22, 2008, he spoke before several hundred Congressional staffers in the Cannon House Caucus Room on the subject of biotechnology medicines and the protection of patient safety. In July 2010, he testified before the Senate Committee on Health, Education, Labor and Pensions about the state of pediatric rare diseases research. He is widely credited with leading the effort in 2010 to form the bi-partisan Congressional Caucus on Rare Diseases in Washington, DC.

In April 2011, Crowley stepped down from his CEO position at Amicus. At that time, it was speculated that Crowley would run for the Senate as the Republican candidate against Sen. Robert Menendez (D-NJ) in 2012. Crowley did not run for Senate and after completing temporary active duty with the U.S. Navy Reserve, he returned to his position as CEO of Amicus in August 2011.

On June 3, 2013, Senator Frank Lautenberg died, meaning that Governor Chris Christie possessed the ability to appoint a replacement. Crowley was mentioned as a potential replacement, along with Thomas Kean, Tom Kean, Jr., Kim Guadagno, Jon Bramnick, and Joe Kyrillos; ultimately, Christie selected Jeffrey Chiesa for the post.

=== Philanthropy ===
Crowley is active in a number of social service and philanthropic efforts. In 2009, he was named to the national board of directors to the Make-A-Wish Foundation of America and became the national chairman of the organization in 2014.

== Awards and honors ==
In 2007, Crowley received the Edward Murphy Award from the University of Notre Dame, given to distinguished lawyers in private practice who have distinguished themselves in the profession of law.

Crowley was awarded an Honorary Doctor of Science from Neumann University in Aston, Pennsylvania where he also delivered the commencement address in 2009. In 2010, he delivered the commencement address at Penn State University, Lehigh Valley. He is a Henry Crown fellow of the Aspen Institute. He has received numerous awards and recognitions for his business leadership and philanthropic efforts, including: New Jersey Biotechnology Industry Organization's 2011 "Dr. Sol J. Barer Award for Vision, Innovation and Leadership"; the 2009 Make A Wish Foundation of New Jersey's "Humanitarian of the Year"; the "2007 E&Y New Jersey Entrepreneur of the Year".

In 2011, Crowley and his wife, Aileen, were given the Family Exemplar Award for their work toward finding treatments for rare diseases by the University of Notre Dame. He received an honorary doctorate degree from the University of Notre Dame and was commencement speaker for the class of 2020 graduation, held in May 2022 as a result of the COVID-19 pandemic.

== Books and movie ==
Crowley was profiled in The Wall Street Journal by Pulitzer Prize-winning journalist Geeta Anand. Anand expanded the profile of Crowley into a book published in 2006, The Cure: How a Father Raised $100 Million – And Bucked the Medical Establishment – In a Quest to Save His Children (ISBN 978-0060734398).

Harrison Ford and Double Feature films optioned the rights to produce a film inspired by Anand's book and the Crowley family. In April 2009, CBS Films began filming this major motion picture about the Crowley family's quest to save their children's lives. The film, titled Extraordinary Measures was released nationwide on January 22, 2010. Directed by Tom Vaughan, Extraordinary Measures stars Brendan Fraser as John Crowley and Keri Russell as Aileen Crowley, and also executive producer Harrison Ford as "Dr. Robert Stonehill" who is a composite character based primarily on Dr. William Canfield and inspired as well by other doctors Crowley worked with. The film premiered at the University of Notre Dame a week before the official release, and the family attended the red carpet premier in Manhattan. The film was featured at the Re:Image Film Festival held by the Diocese of Trenton in 2010. Crowley attended the event to speak about his family and the film adaptation.

Crowley has also written a personal memoir entitled Chasing Miracles: The Crowley Family Journey of Strength, Hope and Joy, coauthored with Ken Kurson. It was published by New Market Press in January 2010 to coincide with the release of Extraordinary Measures.

== Bibliography ==
- John Crowley, Ken Kurson (2010). Chasing Miracles: The Crowley Family Journey of Strength, Hope and Joy. ISBN 978-1-55704-910-0.
