= Lee Tze-fan =

Lee Tze-fan (Chinese: 李澤藩; 5 June 1907 Shinchiku-cho (modern-day Hsinchu), Japanese Taiwan - 10 July 1989) was a Taiwanese painter and art teacher. He studied at Taihoku Normal School when he was 14 years old. His painting career began in 1924 when he was introduced to art by his teacher Kinichiro Ishikawa. He was selected by the Executive Yuan Council for Cultural Affairs (CCA) as one of ten distinguished senior Taiwanese painters in 1983. Lee Tze-fan was also the father of Yuan T. Lee, who won the Nobel Prize in Chemistry in 1986. He returned to teach at Shinchiku First Public School after graduation and co-founded the Hsinchu Art Research Association with He Te-lai in 1933. He later became a teacher at Hsinchu Teachers College in 1938 and became the first chairman of the Hsinchu Art Association when it was established in 1971. Lee lived and worked in Hsinchu his entire life, leaving behind many watercolor works featuring the natural and cultural scenery of Taoyuan, Hsinchu, and Miaoli using his singular watercolor technique, the "rubbing and wiping method", which consisted of repeated wiping and modification. In 1994, Lee’s family converted his former residence into the Lee Tze-fan Memorial Art Gallery.

== Early life and education ==
Lee Tze-fan was born in Taiwan in 1907 (Meiji 40) during Japanese Rule in Shinchiku Cho (present-day Wuchang Street, Hsinchu City). Lee’s father, Li Shu-xun, owned a grocery store near Hsinchu Chenghuang Temple. In March of 1921 (Taishō 10), Lee Tze-fan took his father’s advice and decided to study at the National Taipei Teachers College (present-day National Taipei University of Education). During his sophomore year, the school principal Shihota Shokichi appointed Kinichiro Ishikawa, who had just returned from the United Kingdom, as the art teacher. Ishikawa inspired Lee in painting, and he would often go on plein-air painting sessions in the suburbs with his teacher and classmates. Lee joined the Taiwan Watercolor Painting Association in 1924. In 1926 (Taishō 15), he graduated from National Taipei Teachers College.

== Career ==
After graduation, he took up a teaching position at Shinchiku First Public School (present-day Hsin-Chu Primary School). In 1933, Lee founded the Hsinchu Art Research Association with He Te-lai. On April 21, 1938, during the Japanization movement, Lee’s family was selected as a National Language Family, and Lee changed his Chinese name from the character "李" to "里" (also pronounced "Lee").

In 1945, the government of the Republic of China took over Taiwan, and the following year in 1946, Lee filled in a teaching position for a Japanese teacher and started teaching at Hsinchu Teachers College while also serving as an adjunct teacher at schools including the National Taiwan Normal University and National Taiwan Academy of Arts. In 1956, Lee was recommended as a member of the Tai-Yang Art Association. In 1965, Lee retired from the Hsinchu Teachers College, and served as the school’s adjunct teacher until 1976.

The Hsinchu County Art Association was established in 1971, and Lee served as its first chairman. In 1974, Lee received the Golden Goblet Award from the Art Society of China. Notable exhibitions include the "Lee Tze-fan Exhibition" held at the Apollo Art Gallery in 1979, and the "Lee Tze-fan Solo Exhibition" held at the Min-Sheng Art Gallery in 1980. In 1983, in an attempt to conduct comprehensive documentation of Taiwanese art, the Executive Yuan Council for Cultural Affairs (CCA) named ten distinguished senior Taiwanese painters. Lee was included in the list.

== Death and legacy ==
In early 1989, Lee was bedridden due to cirrhosis and died on July 10 at the age of 82 in his own home.

Lee Tze-fan’s former residence in Hsinchu City has been rebuilt into the Lee Tze-fan Memorial Art Gallery and opened to the public on August 6, 1994. Apart from displaying the artist’s paintings, Lee’s diaries, letters, and the painting equipment and tools that he used are also on display.

== Works ==
=== Subject matter ===
Lee Tze-fan was of the first generation of Hoklo Taiwanese artists who created foreign influenced paintings. His works were performed in the fusion of art styles, between social realism, expressionism and abstractionism. He created thousands of works throughout his lifetime, encompassing a wide range of subject matters. Landscapes, including cultural scenery, were his most common theme. Additionally, he explored subject matters including architecture (towns, buildings, pavilions, and towers), gardens, street scenes, interiors, flowers, still life, people, events, and foreign landscapes.

Lee's paintings during the 1930s mainly depicted childhood memories of grandiose mansions in Hsinchu, such as the Qian-Yuan, Bei-Guo Garden, Yin Hsi East Gate, and Chenghuang Temple.

For a long time he was a professor in National Taiwan Normal University, having many students, mostly from the counties of Hsinchu, Taoyuan, and Miaoli.

Throughout his life, Lee Tze-fan remained committed to using watercolors for the sake of convenience during en plein air painting sessions. He honed his skills by focusing on the landscapes of Miaoli and Hsinchu, often choosing bird-eye viewpoints to depict the mountains. Lee's compositions frequently incorporated plains, valleys, and rivers, along with historical and cultural landmarks in Taoyuan, Hsinchu, and Miaoli. In addition, he enjoyed depicting the daily lives of locals.

=== Painting style and technique ===
Lee Tze-fan's painting style was initially influenced by Kinichiro Ishikawa, but he went on to develop his own unique style characterized by bold, rough brushwork with overlapping lines. Lee's works are known for the incorporation of high chromatic colors, such as red, yellow, blue, and green, and revealed an undercurrent of vitality. After his marriage and the birth of his children, Lee's style shifted to a brighter tone and realism. His realistic style, rooted in "observing nature, grasping inspiration, embracing experimentation, and expressing with various techniques", became the mainstream of Taiwanese local paintings.

In the 1970s, Taiwan's art scene started to favor local realism, bringing renewed attention to Lee Tze-Fan's watercolor paintings.

While teaching at Hsinchu Teachers College, Lee’s works began to incorporate opaque watercolors rather than transparent ones. Lee Tze-fan attributed this change to the shortage of watercolor paper in Taiwan during the early days of the Retrocession of Taiwan, and he was forced to use alternative colored paper and modified his painting technique accordingly. In addition, opaque watercolor pigments allowed for modifications and corrections, enabling him to wash off and repaint areas that he was unsatisfied with to save on paper.

Throughout his painting process, he repeatedly modified and revised any unsatisfactory areas, eventually developing his own unique watercolor technique known as the "rubbing and wiping method".

== Reception ==
In 2007, the National Palace Museum held the "Commemorating the Centennial of Lee Tze-fan’s Birth" exhibition and made the following commentary on Lee's career: "Mr. Lee's paintings reflect the trends of Taiwan's art scene. From the social realism of the 1950s to the abstract expressionism of the 1960s, and then to the return to nativism in the 1970s, Lee was able to break through and evolve at each stage. In the 1980s, he created a style that integrated Eastern and Western painting techniques with a Taiwanese cultural spirit, expressing profound emotions and artistic transcendence." The statement is a complete annotation of Lee Tze-fan's artistic achievement.

== Awards and honours ==
In 1928, Lee Tze-fan participated in the 2nd Taiwan Fine Art Exhibition and his work Summer Afternoon was selected. He then went on to have works selected for the 3rd and 4th Taiwan Fine Art Exhibition as well as the 1st, 2nd, 3rd, and 5th Governor-General Art Exhibition.

== Family ==
In 1930 (Shōwa 5), Lee Tze-fan married Cai Pei, a native from Wu-Qi-Gang Street, Da-Du-Zhong-Bao, Taichū Prefecture (present-day Wuqi District, Taichung). The couple had five sons and four daughters, but unfortunately their third daughter was lost at a young age.

Three of his sons Yuan-Chuan Lee, Yuan T. Lee, and Yuan-Pern Lee were elected to membership of Academia Sinica.

To commemorate his beloved teacher Kinichiro Ishikawa, Li named his first and third sons Yuan-chuan and Yuan-chin, which includes characters that appear in the Chinese translation of Ishikawa’s name.

Lee Tze-fan's eldest daughter Lee Hui-mei married Zhou Zong-wen, the son of Zhou Bi-zhi, who was a member of the Yan family of Yan Dong-nian in Keelung; his fourth daughter is Lee Chi-mei, an emeritus professor at National Chung Hsing University and former Vice President of the university.

== See also ==
- Taiwanese art
