= Extraordinary Measures (film) =

- Theatrical release poster
- Directed by: Tom Vaughan
- Written by: Robert Nelson Jacobs
- Based on: The Cure: How a Father Raised $100 Million — And Bucked the Medical Establishment — in a Quest to Save His Children by Geeta Anand
- Produced by: Michael Shamberg; Stacey Sher; Carla Santos
- Starring: Brendan Fraser; Harrison Ford; Keri Russell
- Cinematography: Andrew Dunn
- Edited by: Anne V. Coates
- Music by: Andrea Guerra
- Production companies: CBS Films; Double Feature Films
- Distributed by: CBS Films (North America); Sony Pictures Releasing International (International)
- Release date: January 22, 2010
- Running time: 106 minutes
- Country: United States
- Language: English
- Budget: $31 million
- Box office: $15 million

Extraordinary Measures is a 2010 American medical drama film starring Brendan Fraser, Harrison Ford, and Keri Russell. It was the first film produced by CBS Films, the film division of CBS Corporation, who released the film on January 22, 2010. The film is about parents who form a biotechnology company to develop a drug to save the lives of their children, who have a life-threatening disease. The film is based on the true story of John and Aileen Crowley, whose children have Pompe disease. The film was shot in Oregon, in the cities St. Paul, Portland, Tualatin, Wilsonville, Manzanita, Beaverton, and in Vancouver, Washington.

== Plot ==
John Crowley and his wife Aileen are a Portland couple with two of their three children suffering from Pompe disease, a genetic anomaly that typically kills most children before their tenth birthdays. John, an advertising executive, contacts Robert Stonehill, a researcher in Nebraska who has done innovative research for an enzyme treatment for the rare disease. John and Aileen raise money to help Stonehill's research and the required clinical trials.

John takes on the task full-time to save children's lives, launching a biotechnology research company working with venture capitalists and then rival teams of researchers. This task proves very daunting for Stonehill, who already works around the clock. As time is running short, Stonehill's angry outburst hinders this company's faith in him, and profit motive upend John's hopes. Even though first trials are on infants, researchers race against time to save children who already have the disease.

== Cast ==
- Brendan Fraser as John Crowley
- Harrison Ford as Dr. Robert Stonehill
- Keri Russell as Aileen Crowley
- Courtney B. Vance as Marcus Temple
- Meredith Droeger as Megan Crowley
- Diego Velazquez as Patrick Crowley
- Sam M. Hall as John Crowley, Jr.
- Patrick Bauchau as Eric Loring
- Jared Harris as Dr. Kent Webber
- Alan Ruck as Pete Sutphen
- David Clennon as Dr. Renzler
- Dee Wallace as Sal
- Ayanna Berkshire as Wendy Temple
- P. J. Byrne as Dr. Preston
- Andrea White as Dr. Allegria
- G. J. Echternkamp as Niles
- Vu Pham as Vinh Tran
- Derek Webster as Cal Dunning

John Crowley makes a cameo appearance as a venture capitalist.

== Production ==
Adapted by Robert Nelson Jacobs from the nonfiction book The Cure: How a Father Raised $100 Million—and Bucked the Medical Establishment—in a Quest to Save His Children by the Pulitzer Prize journalist Geeta Anand, the film is also an examination of how medical research is conducted and financed.

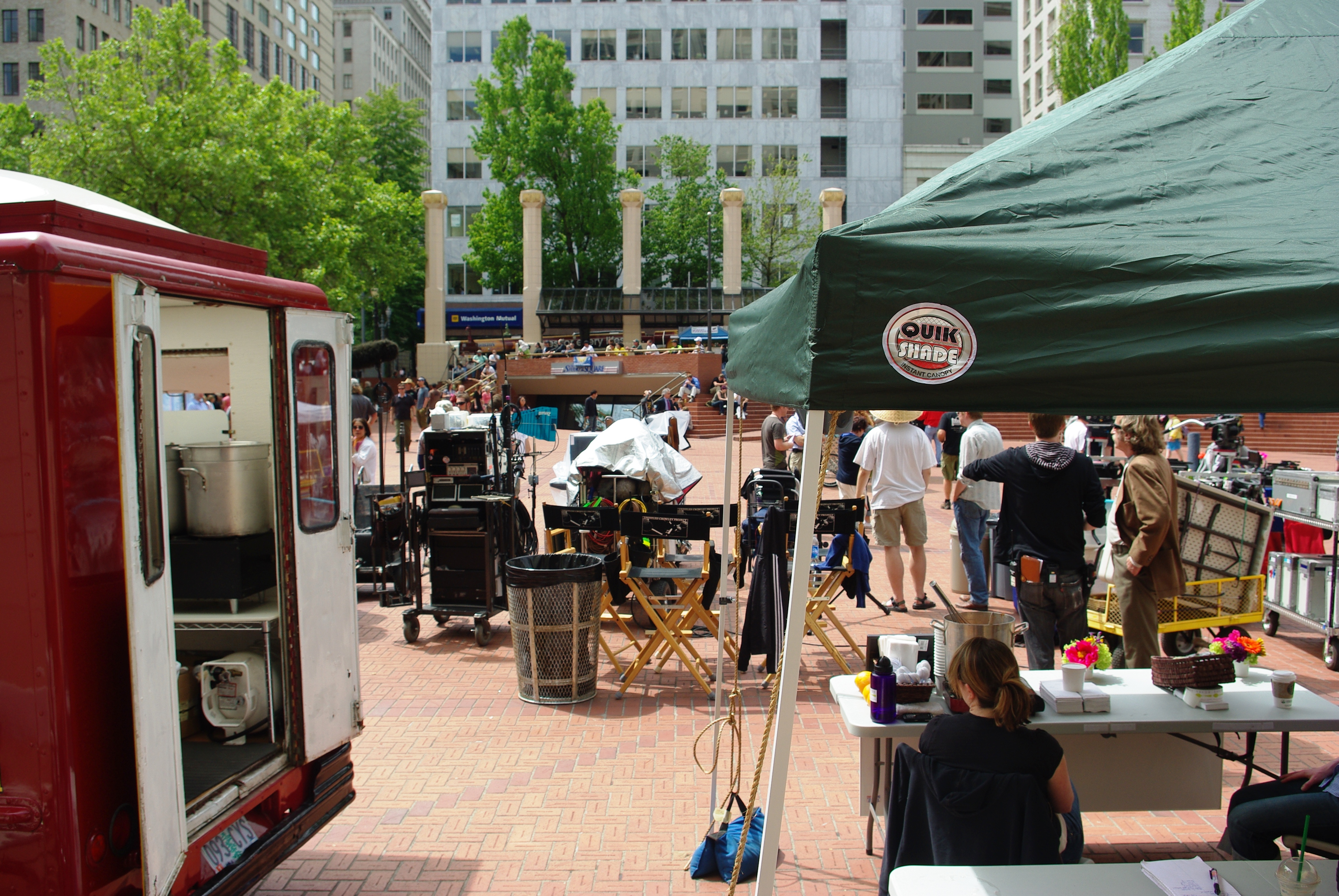
Filming in May 2009 at Pioneer Courthouse Square in Portland, Oregon

Filming took place at several spots in and around Portland, Oregon, mostly at the OHSU Doernbecher Children's Hospital, Veterans Affairs Medical Center and the Nike campus in Beaverton, Oregon. This was the first time Nike allowed filming on their campus and they donated the location payment to Doernbecher Children’s Hospital. During filming, the working title was The Untitled Crowley Project.

In the film, the children are 9 and 7 years old. Their non-fiction counterparts were diagnosed at 15 months and 7 days old and received treatment at 5 and 4, respectively.

== Inspiration ==
Myozyme, a drug developed for treating Pompe disease, was simultaneously approved for sale by the US Food and Drug Administration and the European Medicines Agency. Henceforth, more than 1000 infants born worldwide every year with Pompe disease will no longer face the prospect of death before reaching their first birthday for lack of a treatment for the condition.

The screenplay by Robert Nelson Jacobs is based on Geeta Anand's book The Cure (ISBN 9780060734398). Parts of the book first appeared as a series of articles in The Wall Street Journal.

The small start-up company Priozyme was based on Oklahoma City-based Novazyme. The larger company, called Zymagen in the film, was based on Genzyme in Cambridge, Massachusetts. Novazyme was developing a protein therapeutic, with several biological patents pending, to treat Pompe Disease, when it was bought by Genzyme. The patent portfolio was cited in the press releases announcing the deal.

Genzyme claims that Dr. Robert Stonehill's character is based upon scientist and researcher William Canfield, who founded Novazyme. According to Roger Ebert's review, the character is based on Yuan-Tsong Chen, a scientist and researcher from Duke University who collaborated with Genzyme in producing Myozyme, the drug which received FDA approval.

== Reception ==
=== Critical response ===
Review aggregation website Rotten Tomatoes gives Extraordinary Measures an approval rating of 29% based on reviews from 142 critics and an average rating of 4.88 out of 10. The site's general consensus is, "Despite a timely topic and a pair of heavyweight leads, Extraordinary Measures never feels like much more than a made-for-TV tearjerker." Metacritic, which assigns a weighted average score out of 0–100 reviews from film critics, has a rating score of 45 based on 33 reviews. Audiences polled by CinemaScore gave the film an average grade of "A-" on an A+ to F scale.

Richard Corliss of Time magazine wrote: "Fraser keeps the story anchored in reality. Meredith Droeger does too: as the Crowleys' afflicted daughter, she's a smart little bundle of fighting spirit. So is the movie, which keeps its head while digging into your heart. You have this critic's permission to cry in public." The New York Times' A. O. Scott said in his review: "The startling thing about Extraordinary Measures is not that it moves you. It's that you feel, at the end, that you have learned something about the way the world works."

Ramona Bates MD, writing for the health news organisation, EmaxHealth, stated that the film brings attention to Pompe disease. Peter Rainer from The Christian Science Monitor mentions that Big Pharma got a surprisingly free pass in the film and that it will come as a surprise to all those sufferers struggling to get orphan drugs developed.

Jef Akst, writing for the journal The Scientist, stated that the film is good depiction of the "hard to swallow fiscal issues of drug development."

=== Box office ===
The film opened at #8 on its opening weekend, taking in $6 million. The film remained in theaters for four weeks, earning $12 million.
