= Sen-itiroh Hakomori =

Japanese-American biochemist (1929–2020)

Sen-itiroh Hakomori (箱守仙一郎, Hakomori Sen-itiroh; ; 13 February 1929 – 10 November 2020) was a Japanese-American biochemist.

Hakomori was born in Sendai on 13 February 1929, and graduated from Tohoku University Medical College in 1951. He elected for further study in biochemistry under Hajime Masamune. As a Fulbright Scholar, Hakomori also worked with Roger W. Jeanloz. In 1959, Hakomori began teaching at the Tohoku College of Pharmaceutical Science.

Hakomori returned to the United States in 1964, again working under Jeanloz. In 1966, Hakomori joined the faculty of Brandeis University. He left Massachusetts two years later for a position at the University of Washington. Upon moving to Washington, Hakomori concurrently began work for the Fred Hutchinson Cancer Research Center and later the Pacific Northwest Research Institute. The Society for Glycobiology gave Hakomori its Karl Meyer Award in 1995. He was elected member of the Finnish Society of Sciences and Letters in 1987 and of the National Academy of Sciences in 2000. Hakomori shared the Society for Glycobiology's 2011 Rosalind Kornfeld Award with Yuan-Chuan Lee.

He died at home in Mercer Island, Washington on November 10, 2020.
