= Lee Tze-fan Memorial Art Gallery =

Gallery in Taiwan dedicated to the Taiwanese painter Lee Tze-fan

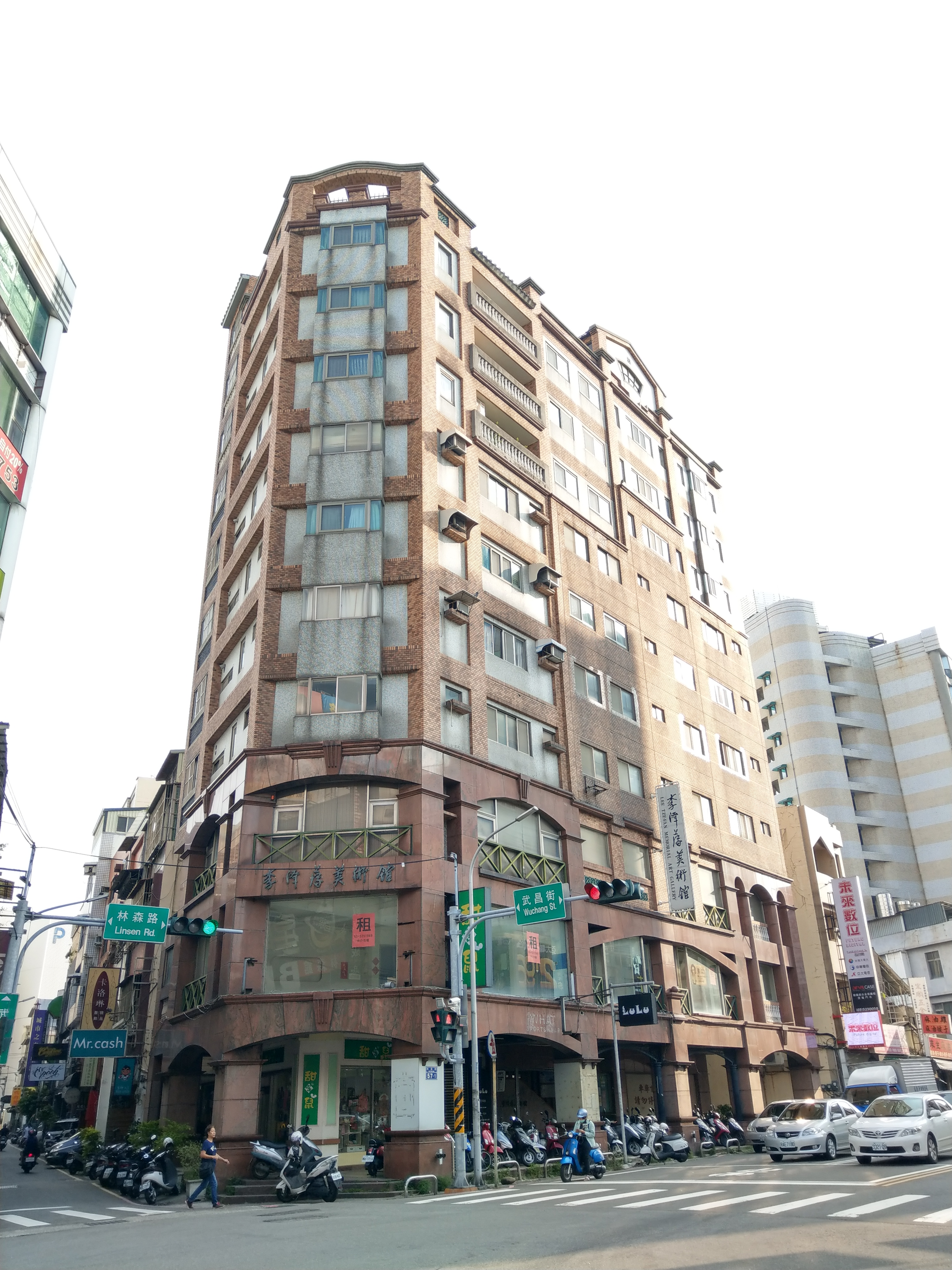
- Lee Tze-Fan Memorial Art Gallery is located on the third floor of this building.
- Established: 6 August 1994
- Location: East, Hsinchu City, Taiwan
- Coordinates: 24.801399°N 120.968201°E
- Website: www.tzefan.org.tw

Lee Tze-fan Memorial Art Gallery (traditional Chinese: 李澤藩美術館; simplified Chinese: 李泽藩美术馆; pinyin: Lǐzéfān Měishùguǎn) is a gallery located in East District, Hsinchu City, Taiwan and dedicated to the Taiwanese painter Lee Tze-fan.

The gallery was established on August 6, 1994, and the building was reconstructed from Lee's former residence. The owner of this gallery is Lee Tze-Fan Memorial Foundation for Art Education. The foundation has been received the donation from Lee's family and students, and focus on researching, collecting and digitizing Lee's paintings and belongings, so they can operate the gallery without selling paintings and fundraising.

One of the gallery's feature is exhibiting Lee's original studio, diaries, letters and painting tools.
