= Knowing Taiwan =

Textbook used in Taiwan

Knowing Taiwan, also translated Getting to Know Taiwan, Know Taiwan or Understanding Taiwan (Chinese: 認識臺灣; pinyin: Rènshì Táiwān), is a textbook for junior high-school aged children that has been in widespread use in Taiwan since 1997. The book is divided into sections that cover social studies, history and geography (Chinese: 社會篇、歷史篇、地理篇).

== Background ==
The Kuomintang (KMT), or Chinese Nationalist Party under Chiang Kai-shek, took control of Taiwan from Imperial Japan after the end of World War II in 1945; two years later in 1947, popular uprisings against KMT rule in Taiwan emerged which were put down violently in what came to be known as the 228 Incident, after which the KMT instituted a period of martial law known as White Terror. When the Kuomintang (KMT) retreated from China to Taiwan in 1949, it imposed a China-centric ideology on the local inhabitants to justify its one-party rule on Taiwan as the sole legitimate government of China. Under the KMT, students in Taiwan were instilled with a sense of Chinese nationalism through the education system, and were required to learn the history of China in the postwar period. From the 1960s to the 80s, the state held a tight monopoly on the entire textbook production process. Though students then did learn history of Taiwan as well, it was included in history of China textbooks, rather than independent history of Taiwan textbooks.

In the 1970s, the Republic of China (ROC) was dealt a series of diplomatic setbacks, including the when the United States switched recognition from the ROC to the People's Republic of China, leading to a surge in opposition and nativisation movements in Taiwan. As a response to this crisis of legitimacy, the KMT under Chiang Ching-kuo began to liberalize the political system, culminating in the lifting of martial law in 1987. In that year, an unofficial grassroots organization met in the 1988 National Non-Official Education Conference and called for the abolition of the national textbooks, while Chiang Ching-kuo died in office and was succeeded by Lee Teng-hui, the first native Taiwanese president. Continuing the liberalizing trend, between 1988 and 1991 the Ministry of Education implemented a deregulation policy for school textbooks, where the state was responsible for producing textbooks for subjects which were tested on national examinations (Mandarin, math, social studies, science) and private publishes could write textbooks for other subjects with approval.

Lee Teng-hui continued the liberalizing trend, arguing that Taiwanese students should learn more about geography and history of Taiwan. In 1992, the newly-formed Democratic Progressive Party (DPP) won a third of seats in the Legislative Yuan. Though short of a majority, this result empowered moderate members of the KMT over hard-liners, as well as galvanized the DPP to push for the abolition of state-sponsored textbooks and for a more Taiwan-centric education. In 1993, the Ministry of Education instituted a textbook reform committee in response to pressure from pro-independence members of the Legislative Yuan. It was expanded in 1994 to a Commission on Deliberation for Education Reform, overseen by the President of Academia Sinica Lee Yuan-tseh, and granted additional funding by Premier Lien Chan. The textbook was written between June 1995 and February 1997, and by contrast to the martial law period, scholars were allowed to devise curricula free of political interference. Following its announcement in June 1997, pro-unification hardliners and conservatives within the KMT and the New Party held protests for three weeks to little avail.

== Content ==
Knowing Taiwan was released in 1996 and adopted as the junior high school textbook in 1997. This textbook aroused much interest in East Asia. The history section is presented as "history of Taiwan", and the era of Taiwan under Japanese rule was introduced more positively than previous junior high school textbooks, with objective facts and surveys. In contrast to earlier textbooks, the authors of Knowing Taiwan hoped to eliminate Chinese nationalist ideology from the curriculum, re-evaluate the Japanese colonial period (which was previously portrayed entirely negatively), and emphasize the historical experience of indigenous peoples on Taiwan (previously looked down upon). Furthermore, the Society section of the textbook explicitly embraced the concepts of Taiwanese identity and nationality.

== See also ==
- History of Taiwan
- Ministry of Education (Taiwan)
