= Yuan T. Lee =

Taiwanese chemist and Nobel Laureate

Yuan Tseh Lee
- 李遠哲
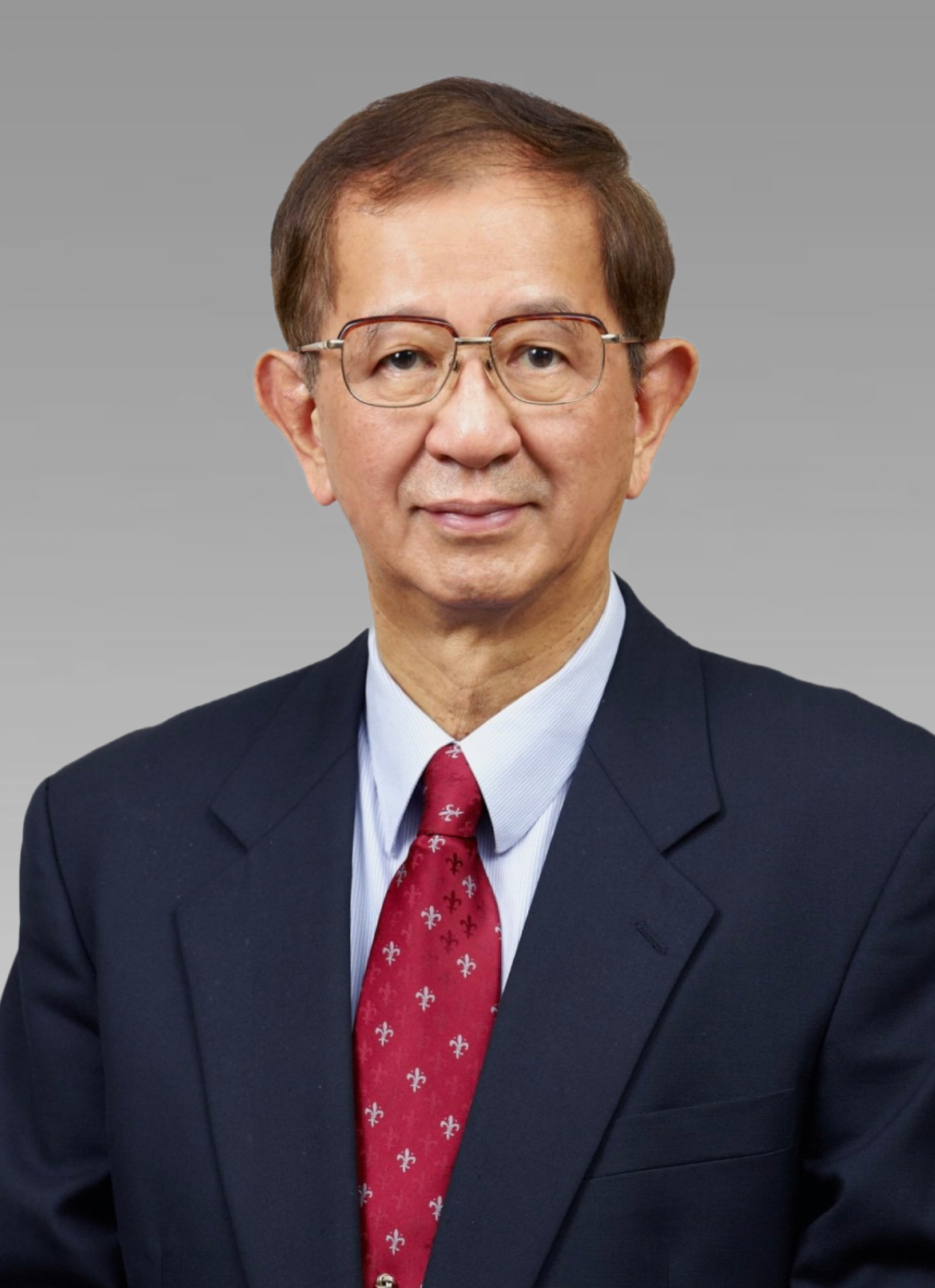
- Official portrait, 2016

Advisor of the National Climate Change Committee
- Incumbent
- Assumed office 7 July 2024 Serving with Eugene Chien
- President: Lai Ching-te

Senior Advisor to the President
- In office 9 November 2016 – 19 May 2020
- President: Tsai Ing-wen
- In office 20 May 2000 – 20 May 2001
- President: Chen Shui-bian

7th President of the Academia Sinica
- In office 18 January 1994 – 18 October 2006
- President: Lee Teng-hui; Chen Shui-bian
- Preceded by: Wu Ta-You
- Succeeded by: Chi-Huey Wong

Personal details
- Born: 19 November 1936 (age 90) Shinchiku City, Shinchiku Prefecture, Taiwan, Empire of Japan
- Citizenship: Empire of Japan (1936–1945); Republic of China (1945–present); United States (1974–1994)
- Party: Independent
- Education: National Taiwan University (BS); National Tsing Hua University (MS); University of California, Berkeley (PhD)
- Scientific career
- Awards: Nobel Prize in Chemistry (1986); National Medal of Science (1986); Peter Debye Award (1986); Faraday Lectureship Prize (1992); Othmer Gold Medal (2008)
- Fields: Physical chemistry
- Workplaces: University of California, Berkeley; University of Chicago; Lawrence Berkeley National Laboratory; Academia Sinica (Taiwan)
- Thesis: Photoionization of alkali-metal vapors (1965)
- Doctoral advisor: Bruce H. Mahan
- Doctoral students: Laurie Butler; Daniel M. Neumark

Yuan Tseh Lee (Chinese: 李遠哲; pinyin: Lǐ Yuǎnzhé; Wade–Giles: Li³ Yüan³-che²; Pe̍h-ōe-jī: Lí Oán-tiat; born 19 November 1936) is a Taiwanese physical chemist who was awarded the Nobel Prize in Chemistry in 1986 for his contributions to the development of reaction dynamics.

Lee is a professor emeritus at the University of California, Berkeley, and honorary director of the Nagoya University Institute for Advanced Study along with Ryoji Noyori. He was awarded the Nobel with John C. Polanyi and Dudley R. Herschbach for "contributions to the dynamics of chemical elementary processes". He was the first Taiwanese person be awarded the Nobel Prize. His research in physical chemistry concerned the use of advanced chemical kinetics techniques to investigate and manipulate the behavior of chemical reactions using crossed molecular beams. From 1994 to 2006, Lee served as the President of the Academia Sinica. In 2011, he was elected head of the International Council for Science.

== Early life and education ==
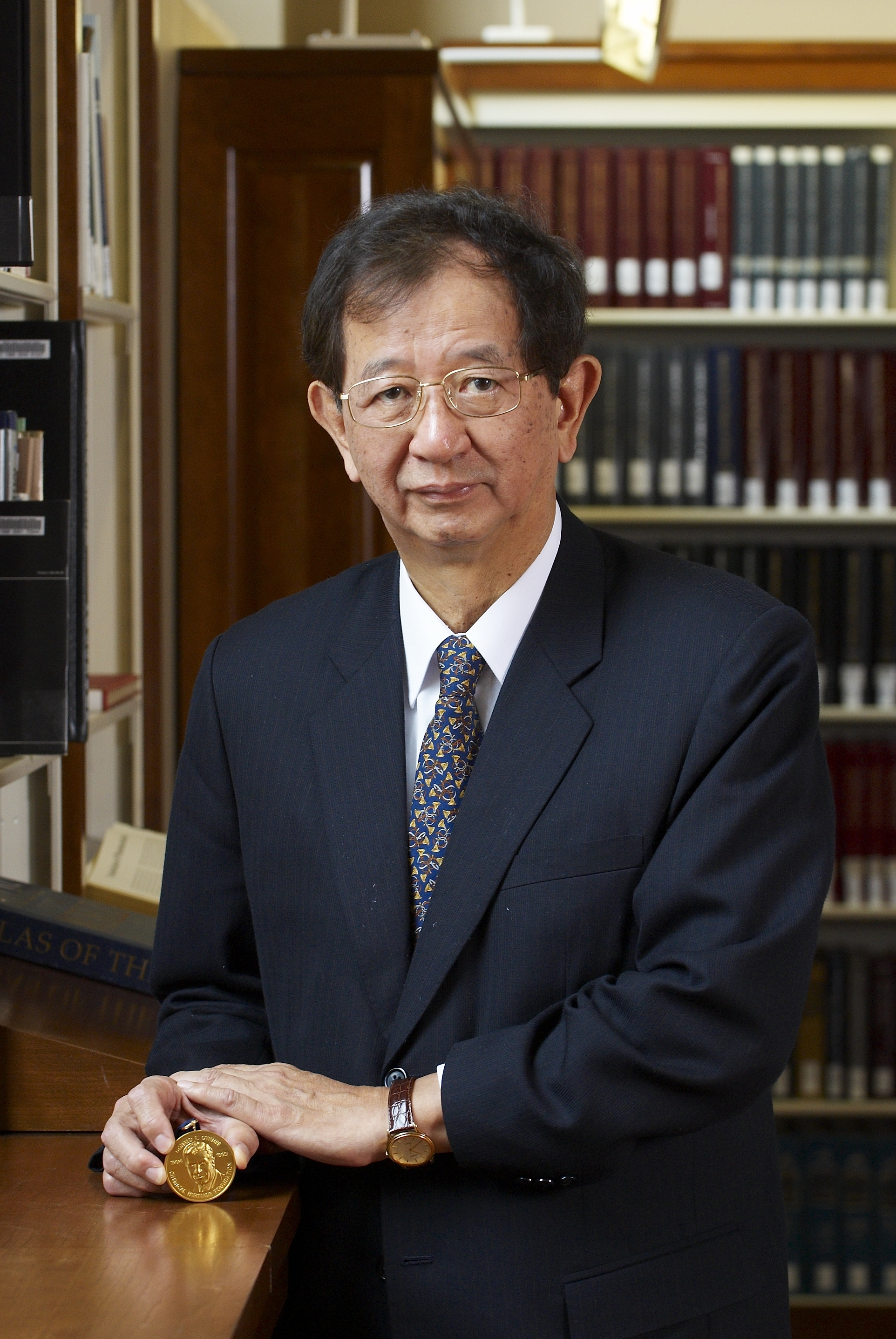
Yuan Tseh Lee, Othmer Gold Medal recipient, 2008

Lee was born to a Hokkien couple in Shinchiku (now Hsinchu) on November 19, 1936. His father, Lee Tze-fan (李澤藩), was an artist, and his mother, Ts'ai P'ei (蔡配; Cài Péi), was an elementary school teacher from Goseikō Town (梧棲港街) in Taichū Prefecture (now Wuqi, Taichung). Their ancestral home is in Nan'an, Fujian.

Lee played on the baseball and ping-pong teams of Hsinchu Elementary School, and later studied at the Hsinchu Senior High School, where he played tennis, trombone, and the flute. He was exempted from the entrance examination and directly admitted to National Taiwan University. He earned a B.S. in 1959. He earned his M.S. from National Tsing Hua University in 1961 and his Ph.D. from the University of California, Berkeley, in 1965 under the supervision of Bruce H. Mahan. He was a member of the Chemistry International Board from 1977 to 1984.

== Scientific career ==
=== Chemistry ===
In February 1967, he started working with Dudley Herschbach at Harvard University on reactions between hydrogen atoms and diatomic alkali molecules and the construction of a universal crossed molecular beams apparatus. After the postdoctoral year with Herschbach he joined the University of Chicago faculty in 1968. In 1974, he returned to Berkeley as professor of chemistry and principal investigator at the Lawrence Berkeley National Laboratory, becoming a U.S. citizen the same year. Lee is a University Professor Emeritus of the University of California system.

=== Nobel prize ===
One of the major goals of chemistry is the study of material transformations where chemical kinetics plays an important role. Scientists during the 19th century stated macroscopic chemical processes consist of many elementary chemical reactions that are themselves simply a series of encounters between atomic or molecular species. In order to understand the time dependence of chemical reactions, chemical kineticists have traditionally focused on sorting out all of the elementary chemical reactions involved in a macroscopic chemical process and determining their respective rates.

Swedish chemist Svante Arrhenius studied this phenomenon during the late 1880s, and stated the relations between reactive molecular encounters and rates of reactions (formulated in terms of activation energies).

Other scientists at the time also stated a chemical reaction is fundamentally a mechanical event, involving the rearrangement of atoms and molecules during a collision. Although these initial theoretical studies were only qualitative, they heralded a new era in the field of chemical kinetics; allowing the prediction of the dynamical course of a chemical reaction.

In the 1950s, 1960s and 1970s, with the development of many sophisticated experimental techniques, it became possible to study the dynamics of elementary chemical reactions in the laboratory. Such as the analysis of the threshold operating conditions of a chemical laser or the spectra obtained using various linear or non-linear laser spectroscopic techniques.

Professor Lee's research focused on the possibility to control the energies of the reagents, and to understand the dependence of chemical reactivity on molecular orientation, among other studies related to the nature of reaction intermediates, decay dynamics, and identifying complex reaction mechanisms. To do so, Professor Lee used a breakthrough laboratory technique at the time, called the "crossed molecular beams technique", where the information derived from the measurements of angular and velocity distributions allowed him and his team to understand the dynamics of elementary chemical reactions.

In 2021, Lee donated his Nobel Prize medal to the National Museum of Taiwan History for exhibition.

== Later career ==
During his tenure, Lee has worked to create new research institutes, advance scientific research within Taiwan, and to recruit and cultivate top scholars for the Academia Sinica.

In 2010, Lee said that global warming would be much more serious than scientists previously thought, and that Taiwanese people needed to cut their per-capita carbon emissions from the current 12 tons per year to just three. This would take more than a few slogans, turning off the lights for one hour, or cutting meat consumption, noting: "We will have to learn to live the simple lives of our ancestors." Without such efforts, he said, "Taiwanese will be unable to survive long into the future".

Lee was appointed the president of Academia Sinica in 1994 and renounced his U.S. citizenship to take the post. As president of Academia Sinica he presided over the creation of the Taiwanese history textbook Knowing Taiwan.

At the request of president Chen Shui-bian, Lee was Taiwan's representative in the 2002 APEC leaders' summit in Mexico. (Presidents of the Republic of China have been barred from joining the APEC summits because of objections from the People's Republic of China.) Lee represented Chen again in the 2003 and 2004 APEC summits in Thailand and Chile, respectively.

In July 2024, Lee accepted president Lai Ching-te's invitation to serve as a consultant on the newly formed National Climate Change Strategy Committee.

Lee was then elected President of the International Council for Science in 2008 and started his term in 2011. He has been involved with the Malta Conferences, an initiative designed to bring together Middle Eastern scientists. As part of the initiative, he offered six fellowships to work on the synchrotron in Taiwan. He is also a member of International Advisory Council in Universiti Tunku Abdul Rahman.

== Personal life ==
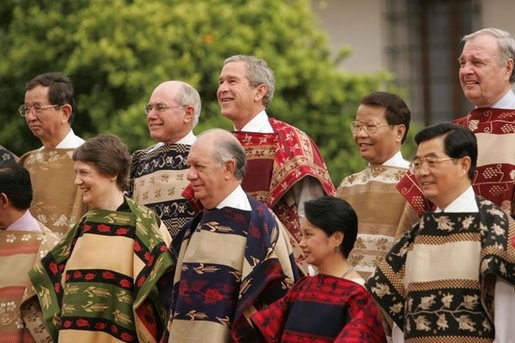
Lee (upper far left) represented Taiwan at the 2004 APEC leaders' summit.

Lee's father was a painter in Taiwan, and his mother was an elementary school teacher. His elder brother Yuan-Chuan Lee has been a professor at Johns Hopkins University for 40 years and was awarded the honor Special Chair Lectureship in Academia Sinica in Taiwan. His younger brother Yuan-Pern Lee was also awarded this honor. Lee's sister Chi-Mei Lee has served as a professor at National Chung Hsing University.

In 2003, he was one of 22 Nobel Laureates who signed the Humanist Manifesto.

=== Politics ===
During the 2000 Taiwanese presidential election, Lee supported the pan-green coalition which advocates Taiwan independence. In the last week of the election he announced his support for the candidacy of Chen Shui-bian who subsequently defeated James Soong in the election. Chen intended to nominate Lee to become premier.

In January 2004, he and industrial tycoon Wang Yung-ching and theatre director Lin Hwai-min issued a joint statement to both Chen Shui-bian and Lien Chan. He backed Chen again in the 2004 elections, issuing a statement of support for the DPP on 17 March, three days before polls opened.

During the 2012 presidential election, Lee expressed his support for DPP candidate Tsai Ing-wen. In early 2016, he appeared and addressed a rally by New Power Party, a party formed by student activists involved in the Sunflower Movement.

=== Climate change ===
Yuan Lee has signed the 2015 Mainau Declaration expressing concern about anthropogenic climate change.

=== Wu Chien-Shiung Foundation ===
Lee was one of the four Nobelists who established the Wu Chien-Shiung Foundation.

== Recognition ==
In addition to the Nobel Prize, his awards and distinctions include Sloan Fellow (1969); Fellow of American Academy of Arts and Sciences (1975); Fellow Am. Phys. Soc. (1976); Guggenheim Fellow (1977); Member National Academy of Sciences (1979); Member International Academy of Science, Munich, Member Academia Sinica (1980); E.O. Lawrence Award (1981); Miller Professor, Berkeley (1981); Fairchild Distinguished Scholar (1983); Harrison Howe Award (1983); Peter Debye Award (1986); National Medal of Science (1986); Golden Plate Award of the American Academy of Achievement (1987) and Faraday Lectureship Prize (1992). Yuan Tseh Lee was awarded the Othmer Gold Medal in 2008 in recognition of his outstanding contributions to progress in chemistry and science. His post-doctoral supervisor and fellow Nobel Laureate Dudley Herschbach congratulated Lee. In 2019 Yuan T. Lee was also awarded the Fray International Sustainability Award by FLOGEN Star Outreach at SIPS 2019.

== Publications ==
- Lee, Y. T. "Crossed Molecular Beam Studies and Dynamics of Decomposition of Chemically Activated Radicals", University of Chicago, United States Department of Energy (through predecessor agency the Atomic Energy Commission), (September 1973).
- Lee, Y. T. & S. J. Sibener. "Internal Energy Dependence of Molecular Condensation Coefficients Determined from Molecular Beam Surface Scattering Experiments", Lawrence Berkeley Laboratory, University of California, Berkeley, United States Department of Energy, (May 1978).
- Lee, Y. T., Sibener, S. J. & R. J. Buss. "Development of a Supersonic Atomic Oxygen Nozzle Beam Source for Crossed Beam Scattering Experiments", Lawrence Berkeley Laboratory, University of California, Berkeley, United States Department of Energy, (May 1978).
- Lee, Y. T., Baseman, R. J., Guozhong, H. & R. J. Buss. "Reaction Mechanism of Oxygen Atoms with Unsaturated Hydrocarbons by the Crossed-Molecular-Beams Method", Lawrence Berkeley Laboratory, University of California, Berkeley, United States Department of Energy-Office of Basic Energy Science, (April 1982).
- Lee, Y. T. "Molecular-beam Studies of Primary Photochemical Processes", Lawrence Berkeley Laboratory, University of California, Berkeley, United States Department of Energy, (December 1982).
- Lee, Y. T., Continetti, R. E. & B. A. Balko. "Molecular Beam Studies of Hot Atom Chemical Reactions: Reactive Scattering of Energetic Deuterium Atoms", Lawrence Berkeley Laboratory, United States Department of Energy, (February 1989).
- Lee, Y.T., "Energy, Environment, and the Responsibility of Scientists", (2007).
