= Bruce H. Mahan =

American chemist

Bruce Herbert Mahan
- Born: August 17, 1930; New Britain, Connecticut
- Died: October 12, 1982 (aged 52); Berkeley, California
- Education: Harvard University (BA, PhD)
- Known for: Gas-phase ion chemistry Chemical education
- Awards: National Academy of Sciences; Alfred P. Sloan Fellow
- Scientific career
- Fields: Physical chemistry
- Workplaces: University of California, Berkeley
- Doctoral advisor: George Kistiakowsky
- Notable students: Yuan T. Lee

Bruce Herbert Mahan (August 17, 1930 – October 12, 1982) was an American physical chemist and professor of chemistry at the University of California, Berkeley known for his work in the fundamentals of chemical reactions and devotion to chemistry education. He was the doctoral advisor of Nobel laureate Yuan T. Lee.

== Early life ==
Bruce Mahan was born August 17, 1930, and was the son of Arthur E. Mahan and Clara Blanche Gray Mahan and grew up in New Britain, Connecticut. He was the youngest of three children.

== Harvard ==
He entered Harvard College in 1948 on a fellowship and graduated with an A.B. degree in chemistry in 1952 as one of the top students. He continued with his doctoral work at Harvard working with the physical chemist George Kistiakowsky on the photolysis of methyl ketene. He received his Ph.D. in 1956.

== Berkeley ==
Mahan was hired as an instructor in the department of chemistry at the University of California at Berkeley in 1956 and he remained there throughout his career. In 1959 he was an assistant professor and became department chair in 1968.

Mahan's research was in the area of gas phase kinetics and photolysis, particularly gas-phase ion chemistry and energy transfer. Yuan T. Lee received his Ph.D. degree in 1965 under his direction and went on to win the Nobel Prize in Chemistry in 1986.

He was diagnosed with amyotrophic lateral sclerosis in 1975 and died October 12, 1982, at the age of 52.

== Textbooks ==
Mahan published Elementary Chemical Thermodynamics in 1963 and University Chemistry in 1965. The latter was described by Ignacio Tinoco as "the model for all high-level freshman texts used today."

== Awards and honors ==
He was an Alfred P. Sloan Fellow 1963-1965 and received the gold medal California Section Award of the American Chemical Society in 1968; he was elected to the National Academy of Sciences in 1976.

The Bruce H. Mahan Chair in Physical Chemistry was established in 2005 and was held by David Chandler until his death. The Bruce H. Mahan Teaching Award is given to outstanding graduate student chemistry instructors at University of California, Berkeley.
