= David Chandler (chemist) =

American chemist

David Chandler (October 15, 1944 – April 18, 2017) was an American physical chemist and a professor at the University of California, Berkeley. He was a member of the United States National Academy of Sciences and a winner of the Irving Langmuir Award. He published two books and over 300 scientific articles.

== Biography ==
Chandler was born in New York City in 1944. He was the Bruce H. Mahan Professor of Chemistry at the University of California, Berkeley. He received his S.B. degree in chemistry from MIT in 1966, and his Ph.D. in chemical Physics at Harvard in 1969. He began his academic career as an assistant professor in 1970 at the University of Illinois Urbana–Champaign, rising through the ranks to become a full professor in 1977. Prior to joining the Berkeley faculty in 1986, Chandler spent two years as professor of chemistry at the University of Pennsylvania and was also a fellow of St John's College, Cambridge.

Chandler's primary area of research was statistical mechanics. With it, he created many of the basic techniques with which condensed matter chemical equilibrium and chemical dynamics are understood with molecular theory. He provided the modern language and concepts for describing the structure and dynamics of liquids, a series of contributions that has allowed quantitative and analytical treatments of simple and polyatomic fluids, of aqueous solutions and hydrophobic effects, and of polymeric melts and blends. He also developed the methods by which rare but important events can be simulated on a computer, techniques that culminated in Chandler's development of a statistical physics of trajectory space. This work enabled his studies of systems far from equilibrium, including processes of self-assembly and the glass transition.

Chandler died on April 18, 2017, in Berkeley, California, at the age of 72.

== Awards and honors ==
Chandler's honors include the Hildebrand and Theoretical Chemistry Awards from the American Chemical Society, the Irving Langmuir Chemical Physics Prize from the American Physical Society, the Bourke and Lennard-Jones Lectureships from the Royal Society of Chemistry, the Hinshelwood Lectureship from the University of Oxford, the Hirschfelder Prize from the University of Wisconsin, the Mulliken Prize from the University of Chicago, election to the National Academy of Sciences and election to the American Academy of Arts and Sciences. He was elected Foreign Member of the Royal Society in 2011. He was twice awarded a Miller Professorship at the University of California Berkeley. In 2016, he was named Miller Senior Fellow of the Miller Institute for Basic Research in Science.

== Bibliography ==
- Chandler, David (1987). Introduction to Modern Statistical Mechanics. Oxford University Press. ISBN 978-0195042771.
