= Yuan-Pern Lee =

Taiwanese chemist

- 李遠鵬
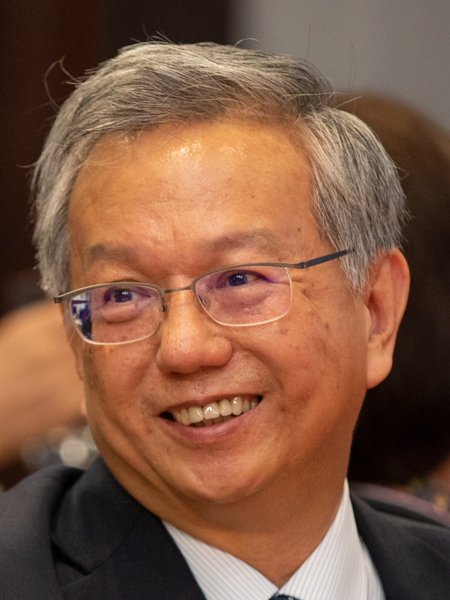
- Born: 25 January 1952 (age 74); Hsinchu City, Taiwan
- Education: National Taiwan University (BS, MS); University of California, Berkeley (PhD)
- Father: Lee Tze-fan
- Relatives: Yuan-Chuan Lee (brother); Yuan T. Lee (brother)
- Scientific career
- Fields: Applied chemistry
- Institutions: National Yang Ming Chiao Tung University

Yuan-Pern Lee (Chinese: 李遠鵬; pinyin: Lǐ Yuǎnpéng; born 25 January 1952) is a Taiwanese chemist.

== Early life and education ==
Lee was born on 25 January 1952 in Hsinchu, Taiwan, the youngest of painter Lee Tze-fan's three sons. He graduated from National Taiwan University with a bachelor's degree in chemistry and a master's degree in chemistry. He then earned his Ph.D. in applied chemistry from the University of California, Berkeley, in 1979.

== Career ==
After receiving his doctorate, Lee began a research career in 1979 at the National Oceanic and Atmospheric Administration before accepting a teaching position at National Tsing Hua University in 1981.

Lee was named a fellow of the American Physical Society in 1999, and subsequently considered multiple times for membership in the Academia Sinica. Eventually, Yuan-Pern Lee was inducted into Academia Sinica in 2008, and the Lees became the first family to have three members serve simultaneously as academicians of Academia Sinica. Yuan-Pern Lee's induction followed that of his brothers Yuan-Chuan Lee and Yuan T. Lee. Yuan-Pern Lee's association with the Academia Sinica began in 1988, when he began working as an adjunct research fellow within the Institute of Atomic and Molecular Sciences.

Yuan-Pern Lee has taught at National Chiao Tung University since 2004 as chair of the Department of Applied Chemistry and director of the Institute of Molecular Science. Lee was part of a research team at National Chiao Tung University that discovered the Criegee intermediate CH2OO particle in 2013. Lee was a 2017 recipient of the Humboldt Research Award. In 2019, Lee, Yuan-Tsong Chen, and Wei Fu-chan won Taiwan's Presidential Science Prize.
