= Wei Fu-chan =

Taiwanese surgeon

Wei Fu-chan (Chinese: 魏福全; pinyin: Wèi Fúquán) is a Taiwanese surgeon.

Wei was born in Tainan and earned a degree in medicine at Kaohsiung Medical College. He received training in plastic surgery at Chang Gung Memorial Hospital, led by superintendent Samuel Noordhoff, who suggested that Wei "go abroad to bring home something new." Subsequently, Wei pursued medical fellowships at the University of Toronto in Canada and the Christine M. Kleinert Institute for Hand and Micro Surgery at the University of Louisville in the United States. Upon completing his surgical training in 1983, Wei returned to Taiwan, and began his own microsurgery training program at Chang Gung in 1984. Four years later, Wei helped establish the Microsurgical Intensive Care Unit at Chang Gung. In 1994, Wei took charge of Chang Gung's Department of Plastic and Reconstructive Surgery. Following the addition of other surgeons, Wei turned from trauma surgery to head and neck reconstruction. In 2013, Wei operated on a woman from Hong Kong injured in the Manila hostage crisis of 2010. Prior to Wei's treatment, the woman had gone through 32 surgeries. Wei's team worked without fully detailed medical records, and the surgery itself took more than ten hours. The Discovery Channel filmed the operation, and aired footage as a portion of a three-part documentary series titled Taiwan Revealed, which was scheduled to premiere on 5 June 2014 in Taiwan, before being aired in 35 other regions across Asia during June and July 2014. The first viewing was held at the Taipei Guest House on 3 June 2014.

Wei has taught at China Medical University and Taipei Medical University. After a stint as vice superintendent of Chang Gung Memorial Hospital in Taipei, he was promoted to director, and served as dean of the Chang Gung Medical College between 2003 and 2011. On 5 July 2012, Wei became the first surgeon elected to Academia Sinica membership. In 2018, Wei received one of three individual Global Healthcare Awards from the Taiwan Global Healthcare Association. In 2019, Wei, Yuan-Pern Lee, and Yuan-Tsong Chen were awarded Taiwan's Presidential Science Prize. In 2020, Wei became a laureate of the Asian Scientist 100 by the Asian Scientist.
