= Danon disease =

- Other names: Lysosomal glycogen storage disease with normal acid maltase activity, formerly GSD-IIb, GSD due to LAMP-2 deficiency
- Specialty: Endocrinology
- Frequency: 0.0001%

Danon disease (or glycogen storage disease Type IIb) is a metabolic disorder. Danon disease is an X-linked lysosomal and glycogen storage disorder associated with hypertrophic cardiomyopathy, skeletal muscle weakness, and intellectual disability. It is inherited in an X-linked dominant pattern.

== Signs and symptoms ==
Males

In males, the symptoms of Danon disease are more severe. Features of Danon disease in males are:

- An early age of onset of muscle weakness and heart disease (onset in childhood or adolescence)
- Some learning problems or intellectual disability can be present
- Muscle weakness can be severe and can affect endurance and the ability to walk
- Heart disease (cardiomyopathy) can be severe and can lead to a need for medications. It usually progresses to heart failure, commonly complicated by atrial fibrillation and embolic strokes with severe neurological disability, leading to death unless a heart transplant is performed.
- Cardiac conduction abnormalities can occur. Wolff–Parkinson–White syndrome is a common conduction pattern in Danon disease.
- Symptoms are usually gradually progressive
- Some individuals may have visual disturbances, and/or retinal pigment abnormalities
- Danon Disease is rare and unfamiliar to most physicians. It can be mistaken for other forms of heart disease and/or muscular dystrophies, including Pompe disease.

Females

In females, the symptoms of Danon disease are less severe. Common symptoms of Danon disease in females are:

- A later age of onset of symptoms. Many females will not have obvious symptoms until late adolescence or even adulthood.
- Learning problems and intellectual disability are usually absent.
- Muscle weakness is often absent or subtle. Some females will tire easily with exercise
- Cardiomyopathy is often absent in childhood. Some women will develop this in adulthood. Cardiomyopathy can be associated with atrial fibrillation and embolic strokes.
- Cardiac conduction abnormalities can occur. Wolff–Parkinson–White syndrome is a common conduction pattern in Danon disease.
- Symptoms in females progress more slowly than in males.
- Some females may have visual disturbances, and/or retinal pigment abnormalities
- Danon Disease is rare and unfamiliar to most physicians. The milder and more subtle symptoms in females can make it more difficult to diagnose females with Danon Disease

== Causes ==
Although the genetic cause of Danon disease is known, the mechanism of the disease is not well understood. Danon disease involves a genetic defect (mutation) in a gene called LAMP2, which results in a change to the normal protein structure. While the function of the LAMP2 gene is not well understood, it is known that LAMP2 protein is primarily located in small structures within cells called lysosomes.

== Genetics ==
It is associated with LAMP2. The status of this condition as a GSD has been disputed.

== Diagnosis ==
Making a diagnosis for a genetic or rare disease can often be challenging. Healthcare professionals typically look at a person's medical history, symptoms, physical exam, and laboratory test results to make a diagnosis. The following resources provide information relating to diagnosis and testing for this condition. If you have questions about getting a diagnosis, you should contact a healthcare professional.

Testing Resources The Genetic Testing Registry (GTR) provides information about the genetic tests for this condition. The intended audience for the GTR is healthcare providers and researchers. Patients and consumers with specific questions about a genetic test should contact a healthcare provider or a genetics professional. Orphanet lists international laboratories offering diagnostic testing for this condition.

== Treatment ==
RP-A501 is an AAV-based gene therapy aimed to restore the LAMP-2 gene which is defective in male patients with Danon Disease and how to cure it. Cardiac transplantation has been performed as a treatment; however, most patients die early in life.

== History ==
Danon disease was characterized by Moris Danon in 1981. Dr. Danon first described the disease in 2 boys with heart and skeletal muscle disease (muscle weakness), and intellectual disability.

The first case of Danon disease reported in the Middle East was a family diagnosed in the eastern region of United Arab Emirates with a new LAMP2 mutation; discovered by the Egyptian cardiologist Dr. Mahmoud Ramadan the associate professor of Cardiology in Mansoura University after doing genetic analysis for all the family members in Bergamo, Italy, where 6 males were diagnosed as Danon disease patients and 5 female were diagnosed as carriers; as published in Al-Bayan newspaper on 20 February 2016 making this family the largest one with patients and carriers of Danon disease.

Danon disease has overlapping symptoms with another rare genetic condition called 'Pompe' disease. Microscopically, muscles from Danon disease patients appear similar to muscles from Pompe disease patients. However, intellectual disability is rarely, if ever, a symptom of Pompe disease. Negative enzymatic or molecular genetic testing for Pompe disease can help rule out this disorder as a differential diagnosis.

== See also ==
- Autophagic vacuolar myopathy
- Glycogen storage disease
- GSD-II (Pompe disease, formerly GSD-IIa)
- Inborn errors of carbohydrate metabolism
- Lysosomal storage disease
- Metabolic myopathies
