= Yuan-Chuan Lee =

Taiwanese biochemist

- 李遠川
- Born: 30 March 1932 (age 93); Shinchiku, Japanese Taiwan
- Education: National Taiwan University (BS, MS); University of Iowa (PhD)
- Occupation: Biochemist
- Employer: Johns Hopkins University
- Father: Lee Tze-fan
- Relatives: Lee Yuan-pern, Yuan T. Lee (brothers)
- Awards: Claude S. Hudson Award; Rosalind Kornfeld Award

Yuan-Chuan Lee (Chinese: 李遠川; pinyin: Lǐ Yuǎnchuān; born 30 March 1932) is a Taiwanese biochemist who is currently a professor at Johns Hopkins University in the United States.

== Life and career ==
A Hsinchu City native born on 30 March 1932, Yuan-Chuan Lee was the eldest son of painter Lee Tze-fan and his wife. Yuan-Chuan Lee graduated from Hsinchu Senior High School, as did his brothers Yuan T. Lee and Yuan-Pern Lee. Lee then attended National Taiwan University, where he earned a bachelor's of science degree in 1955, followed by a master's of science in agricultural chemistry in 1957. Lee completed his doctorate at the University of Iowa in 1962 under the supervision of Rex Montgomery. Lee moved to the University of California, Berkeley for postdoctoral research with Clinton Ballou, and joined the Johns Hopkins University faculty in 1965, where he was appointed Academy Professor in 2011.

In 1994, Yuan-Chuan Lee became a member of Academia Sinica. Seven years later, Lee received the Claude S. Hudson Award in Carbohydrate Chemistry from the American Chemical Society. The Society for Glycobiology's 2011 Rosalind Kornfeld Award was shared between Lee and Sen-itiroh Hakomori. Lee was named a fellow of the American Association for the Advancement of Science in 2016.
