= X-linked myopathy with excessive autophagy =

Genetic disorder

- Specialty: Neurology
- Frequency: 0.0001%

X-linked myopathy with excessive autophagy (XMEA) is a rare genetic disorder caused by mutations in the VMA21 gene. The disorder is characterized by slow progressive dystrophy of proximal muscles of the lower limbs, which begins at the age of 5. Due to slow progression, patients usually remain ambulant into their 50s, also XMEA usually spares heart, peripheral nervous system, and brain (but in rare cases, heart was involved). XMEA belongs to class of disorders called autophagic vacuolar myopathy.

Less than 50 cases had been recorded and they were usually from America and Europe. VMA21 is an essential assembly chaperone of vacuolar ATPase – the principal mammalian proton pump complex. Mutations in this gene increase lysosomal pH. This in turn reduces lysosomal degradative ability and blocks autophagy.

== Presentation ==
MRI of the leg of the patients with XMEA. Fatty replacement in biceps femoris, adductor magnus, vastus intermedius, vastus lateralis can be seen. Semitendinosus, gracilis, adductor longus, rectus femoris are partially spared.

The disease usually presents in childhood, but also can present since birth or in adulthood. The usual symptom is weakness involving the upper legs and affecting activities such as running and climbing stairs. As the condition progresses, patients tend to experience weakness in their lower legs and arms. Some remain able to walk in advanced age, while others require assistance in adulthood, also creatine kinase levels are mildly to moderately elevated. Some patients can also experience respiratory insufficiency, usually nine years since the onset; contractures are also present especially in achilles tendon. Only 3 patients developed cardiac disease.

The muscle fibers are rarely necrotic but have evidence of excessive autophagic activity and ejection of the phagocytosed material. They have increased variation in size and are predominantly composed of round small and hypertrophic fibers. The vacuoles are strongly reactive for dystrophin and lysosome-associated membrane protein 2 (LAMP2). Membrane-bound vacuoles and balls of dense material under the basal lamina are present. Deposition of the C5b-9 complement attack complex, sub-sarcolemmal deposition of calcium and expression of the MHC1 complex also occur. The vacuoles may contain remains of membrane whorls and calcium depoits.

In some cases, patients can experience symptoms of the VMA21-CDG, such as abnormally glycosylated proteins (e.g transferrin, apoCIII), chronically elevated enzymes, mild cholestasis, elevation of cholesterol and steatosis in liver cells.

== Genetics ==
The disorder is inherited in a X-linked recessive fashion, due to gene (VMA21) location on the long arm of chromosome X (Xq28). Usually mutations occur within or near to exon 2, exon 3 and 3'UTR and in case VMA21-CGD mutations are usually located in or near exon 1; most common mutations affect acceptor or donor of splicing sites. VMA21 has two isoforms—VMA21-101 and VMA21-120. The loss of VMA21-101 and sparing of VMA21-120 can be associated with VMA21-CDG, but vice-versa in case of XMEA. Interestingly, dysfunction of both isoforms can cause XMEA and it's unclear why it doen't cause liver symptoms.

== Pathophysiology ==
First, phagophore engulfs targets and turns into an autophagosome; then it will fuse with a lysosome, which is called an autolysosome. Contents inside the autolysosome get degraded by lysosomal enzymes. Normally it is regulated by many proteins such as mTORC1, which inhibits autophagy by phosphorylating Ulk1. In case of XMEA, due to deficiency of v-ATPases, which triggers amino acid insufficiency and blockade of mTORC1, which causes induction of autophagy, and consequently autophagic vacuoles accumulate and cause formation of autophagic vacuoles with sarcolemmal features.

VMA21 normally participates in assembly of vacuolar ATPases (v-ATPase) via chapperoning of the v-ATPase V0 domain, especially v-ATPase V0c and glycosylated V0a (unglycosylated V0a might be left endoplasmic reticulum in order to prevent its incorparation into V0 domain). Vacuolar ATPases participate in the acidification of the lysosome, and in patients with XMEA, pH is increased from 4.7 to 5.2, which in turn impairs lysosomal hydrolases and hampers the last steps of the autophagy; due to impairment of autophagy, mTORC1 gets inhibited and causes more autophagy, which in turn causes formation of more autophagolysosomes with undigested content.

In case of VMA21-CDG, VMA21 experiences issues with assembly and interaction with ATP6AP2 and ATP6V0C, which could possibly start the same cascade of impaired autophagy as in XMEA. Interestingly, impaired lysosomal acidification causes sequestration of the cholesterol inside the lysosomes, which decreases the cholesterol content in the endoplasmic reticulum (ER), which causes cleavage of SREBP1, and initiates de-novo lipogenesis, and this might account for increased LDL in plasma. Defective assembly of V0 subunit causes ER stress (which XMEA mutations don't cause), consequently it can cause steatosis.

== Diagnosis ==
Suspicion of the XMEA can be made by myopathic pattern of electromyography, moderately elevated creatine kinase; biopsy shows rimmed vacuoles and positive immunostaining for sarcolemmal proteins associated with increased autophagy. Diagnosis can be confirmed via genetic testing.

=== Differential diagnosis ===
- Becker muscular dystrophy
- Limb-girdle muscular dystrophy

== Research ==
In 2025, Huang and colleagues made a model of XMEA in zebrafish using the CRISPR-Cas9 system, which showed replication of human phenotype, including: liver issues, disturbed motor function and survival, and importantly decreased acidity in lysosomes and autophagy vacuoles in myocytes. Also, LY294002 and edaravone was tested, and it improved symptoms in fish. In 2026 researchers made mouse model of XMEA using the CRISPR-Cas9 system, which recapitulated human phenotype.

In 2020, Fernandes and colleagues derived muscle cells from patients with XMEA, and it showed increased myotube formation and high fusion index, which might generate cells not functional as normal cells; interestingly, it was not dependent on lysosomal acidification and myogenic factors were not upregulated.

== History ==
The disorder was described in 1988 by Kalimo et al in Finland in three brothers. The same condition affected their maternal grandfather and great-uncle. Saviranta et al mapped XMEA to the Xq region and later Villard et al mapped XMEA locus to Xq28. Later, two studies narrowed to the small region (0.5 Mb) of Xq28. In 2013, Ramchandran et al. discovered that cause of XMEA was mutation in the VMA21.
