= Hsinchu Chenghuang Temple =

- 新竹都城隍廟 (Chinese)
- Hsinchu City God Temple
- Interactive map of Hsinchu Chenghuang Temple
- 24°48′16″N 120°57′58″E
- Location: North District, Hsinchu, Taiwan

History
- Built: 1748
- Built for: Chinese folk religious deities, including Chenghuang and Guanyin.
- Rebuilt: 1926

The Chenghuang Temple of Hsinchu is a temple located in Hsinchu, Taiwan. It is dedicated to the City God (城隍爺), who is believed in Chinese religion to record the good and bad deeds of every person residing in the city. Common prayers made within the temple are for better lives, to seek justice and to avoid flood and drought.

== History ==
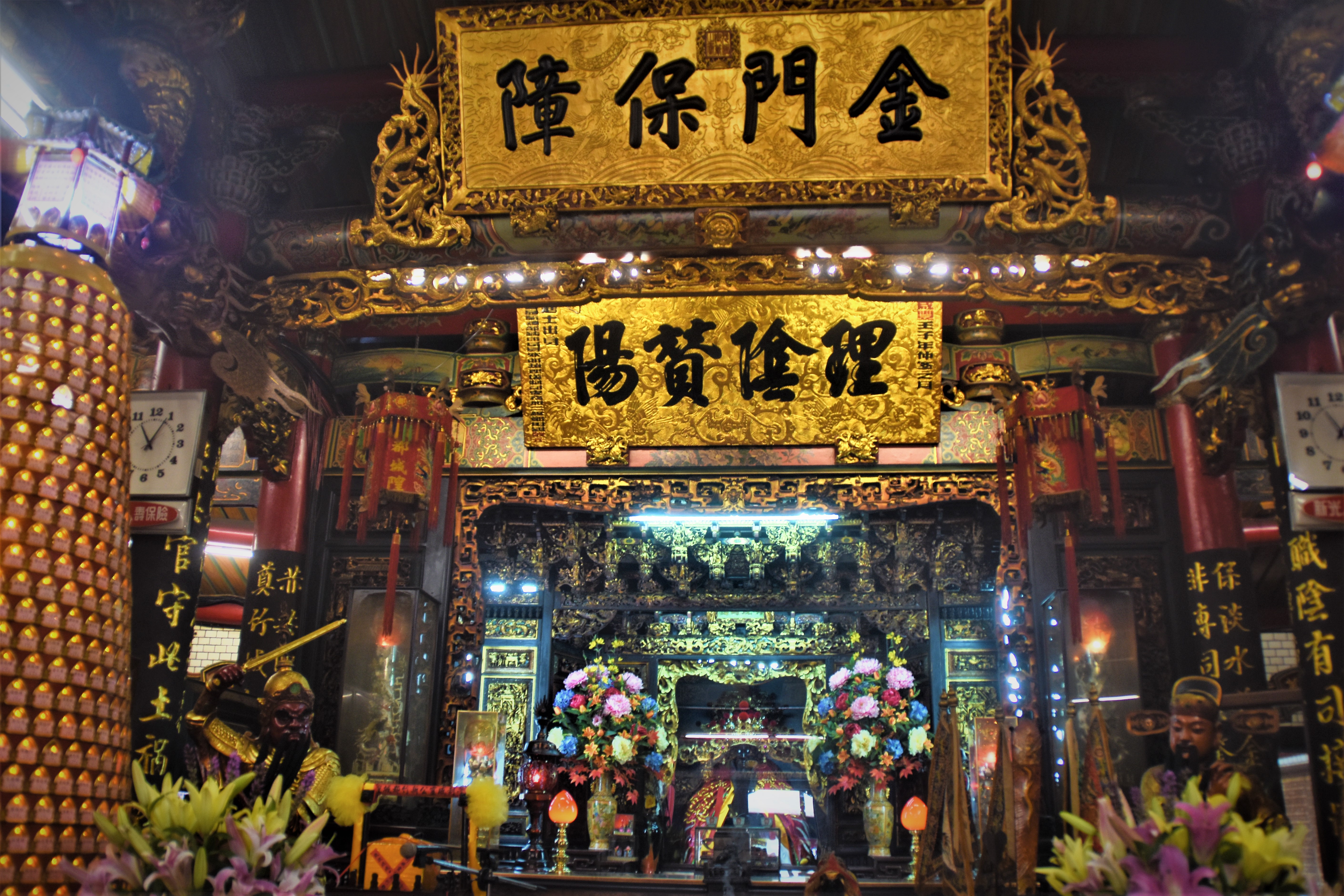
Golden Gate Protection board

The Chenghuang Temple of Hsinchu was built in 1747 by Hokkien colonists. As Hsinchu became a prefecture and as such, the temple also rose in status. In 1891, the complex was chosen as the meeting place of ceremonies. After the ceremony, Guangxu presented the temple with a sign board reading "Golden Gate Protection", which signifies that the City God of Hsinchu protects and gives blessings to the entire country.

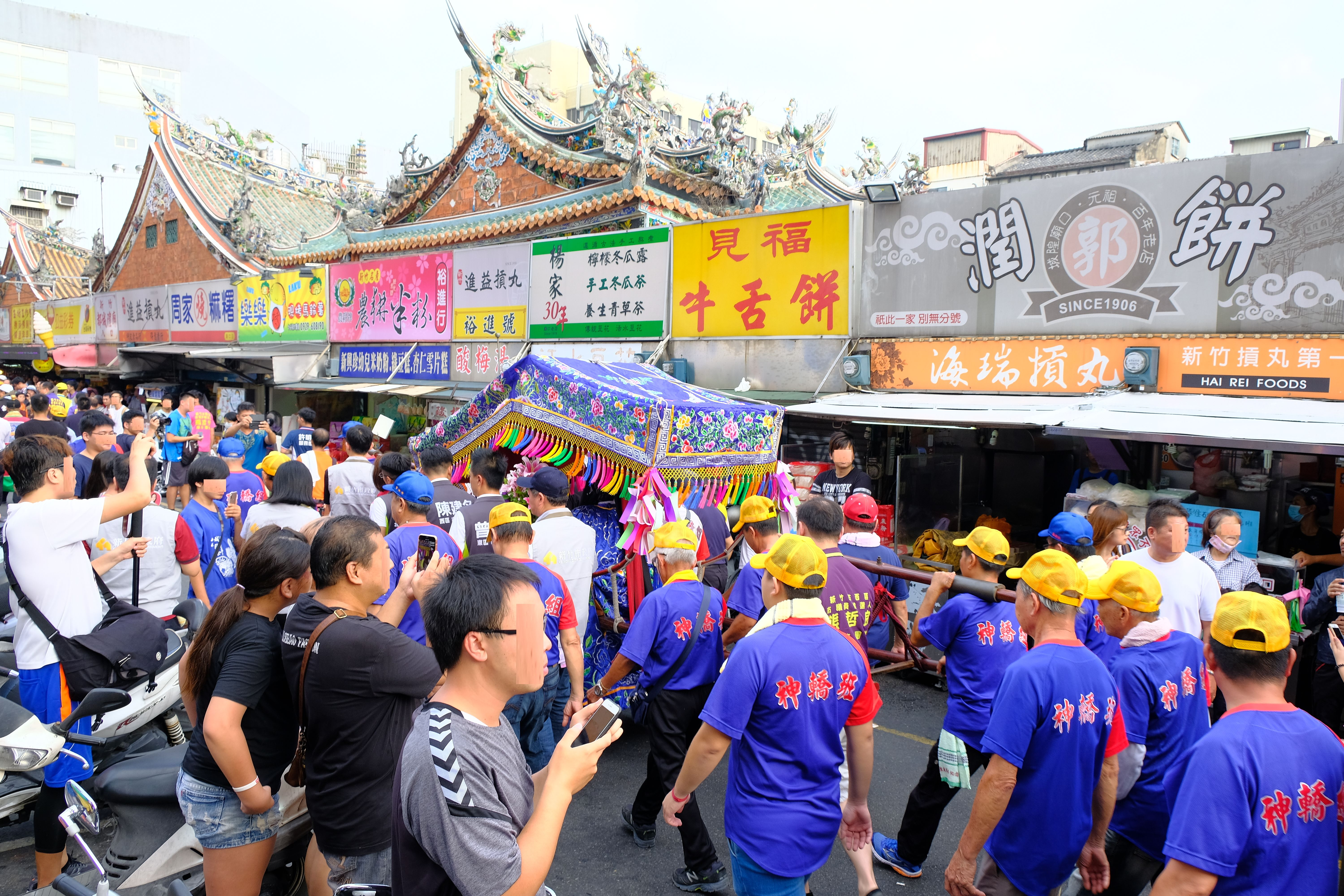
The Parade

== Feature ==
The temple features six halls, each of which have their own meaning. The names of the halls are Bell and Drum Tower, Main Hall, Back Hall, Horenji, Sanchuan Hall, and Protection Room.

== Activities ==
Twelve activities are held yearly at the temple, which includes the parade of the City God. During the parade, many Taiwanese leave home in order to join in the festivities; some set off fireworks and pray to the City God.
