= Geeta Anand =

American journalist

Geeta Anand is an American journalist, professor, and author. She was formerly the dean of the UC Berkeley Graduate School of Journalism. She was a foreign correspondent for The New York Times, as well as The Wall Street Journal and a political writer for The Boston Globe. She currently resides in Berkeley, California, with her husband Gregory Kroitzsh and two children.

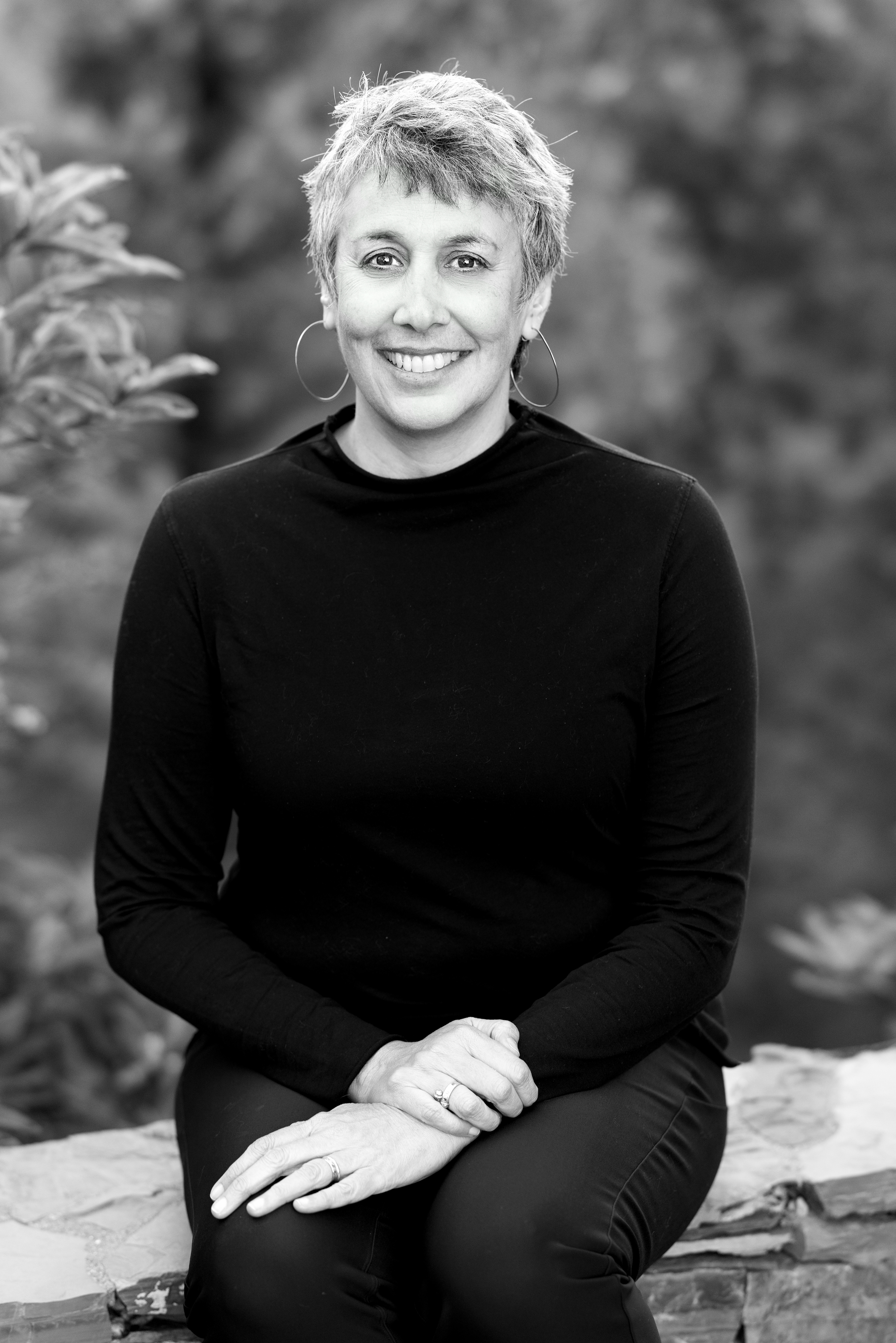
Geeta Anand in 2023

== Career ==
Anand began her career in journalism working for the Rutland Herald between 1990 and 1994 "covering a range of beats, from local government to courts and crime." For the next four years, she worked for The Boston Globe. Starting 1998, Anand began working for The Wall Street Journal writing for its New England regional edition before moving to New York City and covering biotechnology for the same newspaper.

For her work at The Wall Street Journal Anand shared the 2003 Pulitzer Prize for Explanatory Reporting that was awarded to the Wall Street Journal staff. She earned the 2006 Gerald Loeb Award in the category Beat Writing for her story "The Most Expensive Drugs and How They Came to Be". Anand is the author of the book The Cure, which has been adapted into the film Extraordinary Measures.

As of August 2018, Anand joined the faculty of the UC Berkeley Graduate School of Journalism as a professor of Reporting.
