= Joannes Cassianus Pompe =

Dutch pathologist (1901–1945)

Joannes Cassianus Pompe

Joannes Cassianus Pompe (9 September 1901, Utrecht – 15 April 1945, Sint Pancras) was a Dutch pathologist. In 1932, he characterized the condition now known as Glycogen storage disease type II. It is sometimes referred to as Pompe disease.

== Original disease description ==
He studied medicine at the University of Utrecht, and trained as a pathologist in Amsterdam. During this time he came across the symptoms of what is now known as Pompe's disease, or Glycogen storage disease type II, which he described in his 1932 publication Over idiopathische hypertrophie van het hart (English: About idiopathic hypertrophy of the heart).

On December 27, 1930, Dr. Pompe had carried out an autopsy on a 7-month old girl who had died of unknown causes. He found the enlarged heart now known to be characteristic of the infantile form of the disease and had some microscopy slides prepared. These showed that the muscle tissue was distorted into a pentagonal mesh.

== Execution by the Nazis ==
He was arrested in 1945 by the Nazis for hiding a transmitter in his lab used to send messages to the UK on behalf of the resistance. He and 19 others were executed two months later as a reprisal for the destruction of a railway bridge by the resistance.

His older brother was Professor Willem Pompe who was a prominent criminologist at the University of Utrecht and namesake of the Willem Pompe institute.
