= Yuan-Tsong Chen =

Taiwanese physician scientist

- 陳垣崇
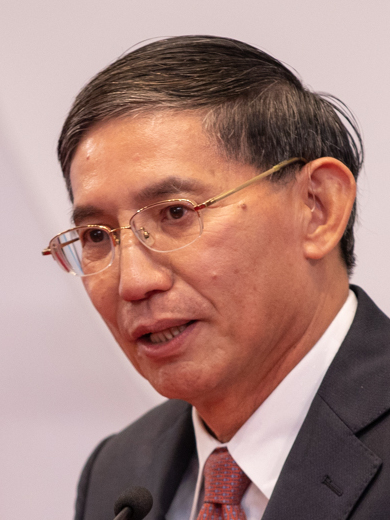
- Chen in 2019
- Born: September 24, 1948 (age 78); Taipei, Taiwan
- Education: National Taiwan University (MD); Columbia University (PhD)
- Scientific career
- Fields: Molecular genetics
- Workplaces: Duke University; Academia Sinica
- Thesis: Studies on human tissue-restricted cell products: The effect of chromosome dosage on gene expression (1978)

Yuan-Tsong Chen (Chinese: 陳垣崇; born September 24, 1948) is a Taiwanese molecular geneticist and physician known for his research on human genetic disorders. He is a professor of molecular genetics and microbiology at Duke University and a distinguished research fellow at Academia Sinica.

== Early life and education ==
Chen was born in Taipei on September 24, 1948. His father, Chen Chiung-lin (1917–2015), was a pediatrician at National Taiwan University Hospital.

After graduating from Taipei Municipal Chien Kuo High School in 1966, Chen attended medical school at National Taiwan University, where he earned a Doctor of Medicine (M.D.) in 1966. He then earned his Ph.D. in human genetics from Columbia University in 1978. His doctoral dissertation was titled, "Studies on human tissue-restricted cell products: The effect of chromosome dosage on gene expression".

== Academic career ==
Chen is a distinguished research fellow at Academia Sinica, where he was the director of the Institute of Biomedical Sciences from 2001 to 2010. He is also a professor of pediatrics at Duke University, where he has taught since 1993. Chen was a 2019 awardee of Taiwan's Presidential Science Award, as were Yuan-Pern Lee and Wei Fu-chan.

== Research ==
Chen's scientific achievements include drug development of recombinant enzyme replacement therapy for Pompe disease, an enzyme-deficiency disorder that causes muscle damage, cardiorespiratory failure and in its severe infantile form, death by 2 years of age. The drug, eventually named "Myozyme", was further developed by Genzyme and received the regulatory marketing approval in Europe and USA in 2006. The story of a father searching for a treatment for his two children with Pompe disease and the development of this rug has been adapted to a film entitled Extraordinary Measures featured Harrison Ford and Brendan Fraser. Chen's research into the disease helped Taiwan develop screening for newborns with Pompe disease, the first nation in the world to offer such medical testing.

Later, Chen's research focus extends to the pharmacogenetics of adverse drug reactions and drug efficacy. His team identified VKORC1 gene variants to play a major role in determining the warfarin dosage, a widely prescribed anticoagulant. They teamed with International Warfarin Consortium to formulate a universal algorithm that can better predict an optimal dosage for each patient. His team also discovered genetic links to the incidence of type 2 diabetes, the strong association of the gene HLA-B*15:02 with carbamazepine, a drug used to treat epilepsy, and that of the gene HLA-B*58:01 with allopurinol, a widely prescribed drug for gout, to induce Stevens–Johnson syndrome (SJS) and toxic epidermal necrolysis (TEN). These pharmacogenetic researches have prompted the FDA to relabel the two commonly prescribed drugs, carbamazepine and warfarin, with genetic information and to recommend genetic screening before prescribing the medication, and paved the road for personalized and precision medicine.

== Personal life ==
Chen was questioned as part of a 2010 investigation into corruption. Prosecutors claimed that Chen and his wife held executive positions at the biomedical company Phamigene. The case closed without an indictment of Chen. Subsequently, the government of Taiwan discussed amendments to the Act Governing the Employment of Educational Personnel, so that full-time researchers and university teachers could establish private enterprises or serve as company presidents. Eventually, amendments to the Fundamental Act of Science and Technology were passed so that public sector researchers could take some positions at private companies.

== Chen Award ==
In partnership with his wife, Alice Der-Shan Chen, who together started the Chen Foundation, they and the Human Genome Organisation annually present the Chen Award to those with research accomplishments in human genetics and genomics in Asia Pacific.
