= Calliotropis pompe =

Scientific classification
- Kingdom: Animalia
- Phylum: Mollusca
- Class: Gastropoda
- Subclass: Vetigastropoda
- Family: Calliotropidae
- Genus: Calliotropis
- Species: C. pompe

Binomial name
- Calliotropis pompe Barnard, 1963

Species of gastropod

Calliotropis pompe is a species of sea snail, a marine gastropod mollusk in the family Eucyclidae.
