= Acid alpha-glucosidase =

Protein-coding gene in the species Homo sapiens

GAA

Identifiers
- Aliases: GAA, LYAG, glucosidase alpha, acid, alpha glucosidase
- External IDs: OMIM: 606800; MGI: 95609; GeneCards: GAA
Enzyme activity
EC #	BRENDA	ExPASy	KEGG	MetaCyc
3.2.1.20	↗	↗	↗	↗

Gene location (Human)
Chr.	Chromosome 17 (human)
Band	17q25.3	Start	80,101,556 bp
Band	17q25.3	End	80,119,881 bp

Gene location (Mouse)
Chr.	Chromosome 11 (mouse)
Band	11 E2|11 83.35 cM	Start	119,158,713 bp
Band	11 E2|11 83.35 cM	End	119,176,280 bp
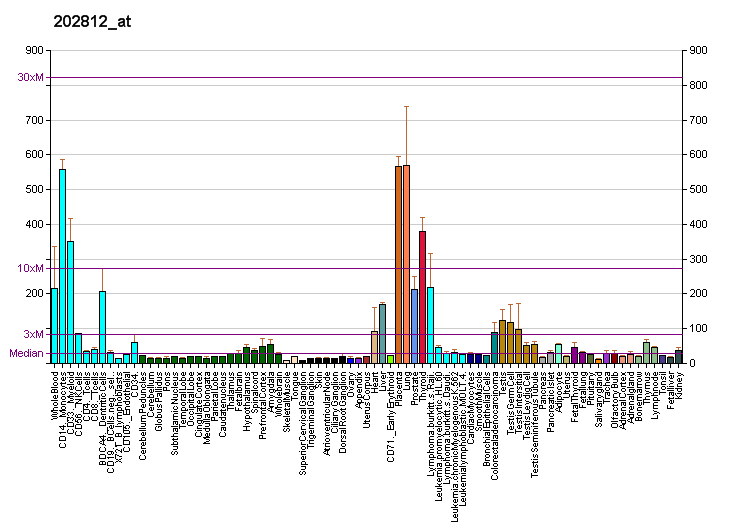
RNA expression pattern
Bgee	Human / Mouse (ortholog); Top expressed in: granulocyte; left testis; right testis; right uterine tube; monocyte; anterior pituitary; right lung; spleen; upper lobe of left lung; apex of heart / Top expressed in: arcuate nucleus; paraventricular nucleus of hypothalamus; median eminence; dorsomedial hypothalamic nucleus; choroid plexus of fourth ventricle; ventromedial nucleus; suprachiasmatic nucleus; supraoptic nucleus; entorhinal cortex; central gray substance of midbrain; More reference expression data
BioGPS	More reference expression data
Gene ontology
Molecular function	hydrolase activity, hydrolyzing O-glycosyl compounds; hydrolase activity, acting on glycosyl bonds; maltose alpha-glucosidase activity; catalytic activity; hydrolase activity; carbohydrate binding; oligo-1,6-glucosidase activity; alpha-1,4-glucosidase activity; alpha-glucosidase activity
Cellular component	membrane; lysosomal membrane; lysosomal lumen; lysosome; extracellular exosome; plasma membrane; azurophil granule membrane; tertiary granule membrane; ficolin-1-rich granule membrane; integral component of membrane
Biological process	vacuolar sequestering; cardiac muscle contraction; muscle cell cellular homeostasis; neuromuscular process controlling posture; locomotory behavior; neuromuscular process controlling balance; regulation of the force of heart contraction; diaphragm contraction; heart morphogenesis; maltose metabolic process; glycogen catabolic process; sucrose metabolic process; tissue development; glycogen metabolic process; metabolism; lysosome organization; striated muscle contraction; glucose metabolic process; neutrophil degranulation; carbohydrate metabolic process
Sources:Amigo / QuickGO
Orthologs
Databases	NCBI: entry; OMA: entry
Species	Human	Mouse
Entrez	2548	14387
Ensembl	ENSG00000171298	ENSMUSG00000025579
UniProt	P10253	P70699
RefSeq (mRNA)	NM_000152; NM_001079803; NM_001079804	NM_001159324; NM_008064
RefSeq (protein)	NP_000143; NP_001073271; NP_001073272	NP_001152796; NP_032090
Location (UCSC)	Chr 17: 80.1 – 80.12 Mb	Chr 11: 119.16 – 119.18 Mb
PubMed search
- Wikidata
View/Edit Human	View/Edit Mouse

Acid alpha-glucosidase, also called acid maltase, is an enzyme that helps to break down glycogen in the lysosome. It is functionally similar to glycogen debranching enzyme, but is on a different chromosome, processed differently by the cell and is located in the lysosome rather than the cytosol. In humans, it is encoded by the GAA gene. Errors in this gene cause glycogen storage disease type II (Pompe disease).

== Function ==
This gene encodes lysosomal alpha-glucosidase, which is essential for the degradation of glycogen to glucose in lysosomes. Different forms of acid alpha-glucosidase are obtained by proteolytic processing. Defects in this gene are the cause of glycogen storage disease II, also known as Pompe disease, which is an autosomal recessive disorder with a broad clinical spectrum. Three transcript variants encoding the same protein have been found for this gene.
