= Alglucosidase alfa =

Enzyme replacement therapy drug

Clinical data
- Trade names: Myozyme, Lumizyme, others
- AHFS/Drugs.com: Monograph
- License data: US DailyMed: Alglucosidase alfa
- Routes of administration: Intravenous
- ATC code: A16AB07 (WHO)

Legal status
- Legal status: AU: S4 (Prescription only); US: ℞-only; EU: Rx-only

Identifiers
- IUPAC name: Human glucosidase, prepro-α-[199-arginine,223-histidine]
- CAS Number: 420784-05-0
- DrugBank: DB01272
- ChemSpider: none
- UNII: DTI67O9503
- KEGG: D03207

Chemical and physical data
- Formula: C_{4758}H_{7262}N_{1274}O_{1369}S_{35}
- Molar mass: 105338 g·mol^{−1}

Alglucosidase alfa, sold under the brand name Myozyme among others, is an enzyme replacement therapy (ERT) orphan drug for treatment of Pompe disease (Glycogen storage disease type II), a rare lysosomal storage disorder (LSD). Chemically, the drug is an analog of the enzyme that is deficient in patients affected by Pompe disease, alpha-glucosidase. It is the first drug available to treat this disease.

It was approved for medical use in the United States in April 2006, as Myozyme and in May 2010, as Lumizyme.

== Medical uses ==
Alglucosidase alfa is indicated for people with Pompe disease (GAA deficiency).

In 2014 the U.S. Food and Drug Administration announced the approval of alglucosidase alfa for treatment of people with infantile-onset Pompe disease, including people who are less than eight years of age. In addition, the Risk Evaluation and Mitigation Strategy (REMS) is being eliminated.

== Side effects ==
Common observed adverse reactions to alglucosidase alfa treatment are pneumonia, respiratory complications, infections and fever. More serious reactions reported include heart and lung failure and allergic shock. Myozyme boxes carry warnings regarding the possibility of life-threatening allergic response.

== Society and culture ==
=== Economics ===
Some American health plans have refused to subsidize alglucosidase alfa for adults because it lacks approval for treatment in adults, as well as its high cost (US$ 300,000 per year for life).

In 2015, alglucosidase alfa was ranked the costliest drug per patient, with an average charge of US$630,159.
