= FIASMA =

Functional inhibitors of acid sphingomyelinase, or FIASMA, is a large group of pharmacological compounds inhibiting the enzyme acid sphingomyelinase (ASM, EC 3.1.4.12). This enzyme is mainly located within the lysosome, where it cleaves sphingomyelin to ceramide and sphingosine, the latter of which is then phosphorylated to sphingosine-1-phosphate. These metabolites, and subsequent inhibition of the enzyme, influence the balance between cell death (apoptosis) and cell growth (proliferation). A lack of regulation of this sensitive equilibrium can lead to serious clinical consequences.

The acronym "FIASMA" was introduced by Kornhuber and coworkers; it is derived from the term Functional Inhibitor of Acid SphingoMyelinAse.

== Mechanism of action of FIASMAs ==
FIASMAs inhibit the ASM via an indirect, functional mechanism. They insert into the inner leaf of the lysosomal membrane and subsequently cause membrane-associated enzymes, such as ASM, to detach. Upon detachment from the membrane, these enzymes are cleaved and degraded within lysosomes. Inhibition of ASM by certain drugs has been known about for a long time, but systematic studies which characterize the pharmacological group of FIASMAs are relatively recent. ASM is not completely inhibited by FIASMAs and a low residual activity remains, allowing sufficient metabolism for cellular survival to occur. Application of FIASMAs therefore do not result in a clinical condition like Niemann-Pick disease, where ASM-activity is completely lacking because of genetic mutations.

In contrast to FIASMAs, a screen of over 346,000 small molecules found only 20 that were direct inhibitors of acid sphingomyelinase. These 20 included amiodarone and etidronic acid.

== Properties of FIASMAs ==
FIASMAs are structurally diverse, but have common physicochemical properties. All FIASMAs identified so far share a basic nitrogen atom and lipophilic part, which characterizes them as "cationic amphiphilic drugs". Additionally, they also violate Lipinski's Rule of Five more often than non-FIASMAs. Still, they are highly bioavailable and reabsorbed by the gastrointestinal tract. In general, they also show high blood–brain barrier permeability.

Ceramide and sphingomyelin have clinical relevance:

- In patients with major depressive disorder, elevated ASM activity has been observed.
- In cystic fibrosis, accumulation of ceramide can be lowered using FIASMAs such as amitriptyline.

== Known drugs acting as FIASMAs ==
Cell culture-based experiments identified the listed compounds as FIASMAs (antidepressants are in boldface). These experiments used the human cell line H4. The ASM activity was measured using a radiolabel assay. In case of absent experimental data a chemoinformatic prediction system has been proposed, which enables identification of FIASMAs based on molecular properties.

- Alverine
- Amiodarone
- **Amitriptyline**
- Amlodipine
- Aprindine
- Astemizole
- AY-9944
- Benzatropine
- Bepridil
- Biperiden
- Camylofin
- Carvedilol
- Cepharanthine
- Chlorpromazine
- Chlorprothixene
- Cinnarizine
- Clemastine
- Clofazimine
- Clomiphene
- **Clomipramine**
- Cloperastine
- Conessine
- Cyclobenzaprine
- Cyproheptadine
- **Desipramine**
- Desloratadine
- Dicycloverine
- Dicyclomine
- Dilazep
- Dimebon
- **Doxepin**
- Drofenine
- Emetine
- Fendiline
- Flunarizine
- **Fluoxetine**
- Flupentixol
- Fluphenazine
- **Fluvoxamine**
- Hydroxyzine
- **Imipramine**
- **Lofepramine**
- Loperamid
- Loratadin
- **Maprotiline**
- Mebeverine
- Mebhydrolin
- Mepacrine
- Mibefradil
- **Norfluoxetine**
- **Nortriptyline**
- **Paroxetine**
- Penfluridol
- Perhexiline
- Perphenazine
- Pimethixene
- Pimozide
- Profenamine
- Promazine
- Promethazine
- **Protriptyline**
- Sertindole
- **Sertraline**
- Solasodine
- Suloctidil
- Tamoxifen
- Terfenadine
- Thioridazine
- Tomatidine
- Trifluoperazin
- Triflupromazine
- **Trimipramine**
- Zolantidine
