= List of adverse effects of paroxetine =

This is a list of adverse effects of the antidepressant paroxetine, sorted by frequency of occurrence.

== Very common ==
Very common (10-100% incidence) adverse effects include:

- Nausea
- Sexual dysfunction (including anorgasmia (difficulty achieving an orgasm), erectile dysfunction, genital anaesthesia, ejaculation disorder, loss of libido etc.). Paroxetine is associated with a higher rate of sexual dysfunction than other SSRIs.
- Impaired concentration
- Somnolence is more common with paroxetine than with other SSRIs.
- Insomnia
- Headache
- Dry mouth

== Common ==
Common (1-10% incidence) adverse effects include:

- Changes in appetite
- Dyspepsia (indigestion)
- Tooth disorder
- Stomatitis
- Oropharyngeal disorder
- Flatulence
- Impaired urination
- Urinary frequency
- Agitation
- Abnormal dreams (including intense dreams or nightmares)
- Hypercholesterolaemia (elevated blood cholesterol)
- Dizziness
- Tremor
- Blurred vision
- Yawning
- Diarrhoea which is less common with paroxetine than with other SSRIs.
- Constipation (if chronic may lead to hemorrhoids)
- Vomiting
- Anxiety
- Nervousness
- Hypomania, may occur in as many as 8% of patients being treated with paroxetine. May be more common in those with bipolar disorder.
- Asthenia
- Weight gain or loss. Usually gain, paroxetine tends to produce more weight gain than other SSRIs.
- Confusion
- Emotional lability
- Myoclonus
- Myopathy
- Myalgia
- Myasthenia
- Drugged feeling
- Hyperthesia
- Respiratory disorder
- Pharyngitis
- Increased cough
- Rhinitis
- Taste perversion
- Abnormal vision
- Pruritus (itching)
- Sweat gland disorder
- Abdominal pain
- Fever
- Chest pain
- Trauma
- Back pain
- Malaise
- Pain
- Palpitations
- Vasodilatation
- Postural hypotension (a drop in blood pressure upon standing up)
- Hypertension (high blood pressure)
- Syncope (fainting)
- Tachycardia (high heart rate)

== Uncommon ==
Uncommon (0.1-1% incidence) adverse effects include:

- Abnormal bleeding, predominantly of the skin and mucous membranes (mostly ecchymosis)
- Confusion
- Hallucinations
- Extrapyramidal disorders (which occurs more commonly in paroxetine-treating patients than patients treated with other SSRIs)
- Sinus tachycardia
- Transient changes in blood pressure
- Urinary retention
- Urinary incontinence
- Allergic reaction
- Chills
- Face oedema
- Infection
- Bradycardia
- Conduction abnormalities
- Abnormal ECG
- Hypotension
- Ventricular extrasystoles
- Acne
- Alopecia (hair loss)
- Dry skin
- Eczema
- Furunculosis
- Herpes simplex
- Urticaria
- Bruxism
- Buccal cavity disorders
- Dysphagia
- Eructation
- Gastroenteritis
- Gastrointestinal flu
- Glossitis
- Increased salivation
- Abnormal liver function tests
- Mouth ulceration
- Rectal haemorrhage
- Miscarriage
- Amenorrhoea (lack of menstrual cycles)
- Breast pain
- Cystitis
- Dysmenorrhoea
- Dysuria
- Menorrhagia
- Nocturia
- Polyuria
- Urinary tract infection
- Urinary urgency
- Vaginitis
- Anaemia
- Leucopenia
- Lymphadenopathy
- Purpura
- White blood cell abnormality
- Oedema
- Hyperglycaemia (high blood sugar)
- Peripheral oedema
- Thirst
- Arthralgia
- Arthritis
- Traumatic fracture
- Abnormal thinking
- Akinesia
- Alcohol use disorder
- Amnesia (memory loss)
- Ataxia
- Convulsion
- Lack of emotion
- Paranoid reaction
- Asthma
- Bronchitis
- Dyspnoea (air hunger)
- Epistaxis
- Hyperventilation
- Pneumonia
- Respiratory flu
- Sinusitis
- Abnormality of accommodation
- Conjunctivitis
- Ear pain
- Eye pain
- Mydriasis
- Otitis media
- Tinnitus
- Keratoconjunctivitis

== Rare ==
Rare (0.01-0.1% incidence) adverse effects include:

- Mania, may be more common in those that either have or have a family history of bipolar disorder.
- Depersonalisation
- Panic disorder
- Akathisia
- Restless legs syndrome
- Elevated liver enzymes
- Hyperprolactinaemia (elevated serum prolactin)
- Galactorrhoea (lactation that is not associated with pregnancy or breastfeeding)
- Abnormal laboratory value
- Abscess
- Adrenergic syndrome
- Cellulitis
- Chills and fever
- Cyst
- Hernia
- Intentional overdose
- Neck rigidity
- Pelvic pain
- Peritonitis
- Substernal chest pain
- Ulcer
- Angina pectoris
- Arrhythmia
- Atrial arrhythmia
- Atrial fibrillation
- Bundle branch block
- Cerebral ischaemia
- Cerebrovascular accident (stroke)
- Congestive heart failure
- Extrasystoles
- Low cardiac output
- Myocardial infarct (heart attack)
- Myocardial ischaemia
- Pallor
- Phlebitis
- Pulmonary embolus
- Supraventricular extrasystoles
- Thrombophlebitis
- Thrombosis
- Varicose vein
- Vascular headache
- Angioedema
- Contact dermatitis
- Erythema nodosum
- Herpes zoster
- Hirsutism
- Maculopapular rash
- Photosensitivity
- Skin discolouration
- Skin ulcer
- Diabetes mellitus
- Hyperthyroidism
- Hypothyroidism
- Thyroiditis
- Aphthous stomatitis
- Bloody diarrhoea
- Bulimia
- Colitis
- Duodenitis
- Oesophagitis
- Faecal impaction
- Faecal incontinence
- Gastritis
- Gingivitis
- Haematemesis (vomiting blood)
- Hepatitis
- Ileus
- Jaundice
- Melaena (black faeces as a result of bleeding in the stomach)
- Salivary gland enlargement
- Stomach ulcer
- Stomatitis
- Tongue oedema
- Tooth caries
- Tooth malformation
- Breast atrophy
- Female lactation
- Haematuria (blood in the urine)
- Kidney calculus (kidney stones)
- Abnormal kidney function
- Kidney pain
- Mastitis
- Nephritis
- Oliguria
- Urethritis
- Urine abnormality
- Vaginal candidiasis
- Eosinophilia
- Iron deficiency anaemia
- Leucocytosis
- Lymphoedema
- Lymphocytosis
- Microcytic anaemia
- Monocytosis
- Normocytic anaemia
- Increased alkaline phosphatase
- Bilirubinaemia
- Dehydration
- Gout
- Hyperphosphataemia (elevated levels of phosphate in the blood)
- Hypocalcaemia (low blood calcium)
- Hypoglycaemia (low blood sugar)
- Hypokalaemia (low blood potassium)
- Hyponatraemia (low blood sodium)
- Obesity
- Arthrosis
- Bursitis
- Cartilage disorder
- Myositis
- Osteoporosis (brittle bones)
- Tetany
- Abnormal electroencephalograph
- Abnormal gait
- Choreoathetosis
- Circumoral paraesthesia
- Delirium
- Delusions
- Diplopia
- Drug dependence
- Dysarthria
- Euphoria
- Fasciculations
- Grand mal convulsions
- Hyperalgesia
- Hysteria
- Increased libido
- Manic depressive reaction
- Meningitis
- Myelitis
- Neuralgia
- Neuropathy
- Nystagmus
- Psychosis
- Psychotic depression
- Increased reflexes
- Stupor
- Withdrawal syndrome
- Hiccup
- Lung fibrosis
- Increased sputum
- Voice alteration
- Emphysema
- Pulmonary oedema
- Amblyopia
- Specified cataract
- Conjunctival oedema
- Corneal lesion
- Corneal ulcer
- Exophthalmos
- Eye haemorrhage
- Glaucoma
- Hyperacusis
- Otitis externa
- Photophobia
- Retinal haemorrhage (bleeding into the retina)
- Taste loss
- Anisocoria
- Deafness
- Activation syndrome

== Very rare ==
Rare (<0.01% incidence) adverse effects include:

- Thrombocytopenia
- Syndrome of inappropriate secretion of antidiuretic hormone (SIADH)
- Serotonin syndrome (symptoms may include agitation, confusion, diaphoresis, hallucinations, hyperreflexia, myoclonus, shivering, tachycardia and tremor)
- Gastrointestinal bleeding
- Hepatic events (such as hepatitis, sometimes associated with jaundice and/or liver failure)
- Priapism
- Severe cutaneous adverse reactions (including erythema multiforme, Stevens–Johnson syndrome and toxic epidermal necrolysis)
- Photosensitivity reactions
