= Ladislav Haškovec =

Czech neuropsychiatrist, eugenicist and physician

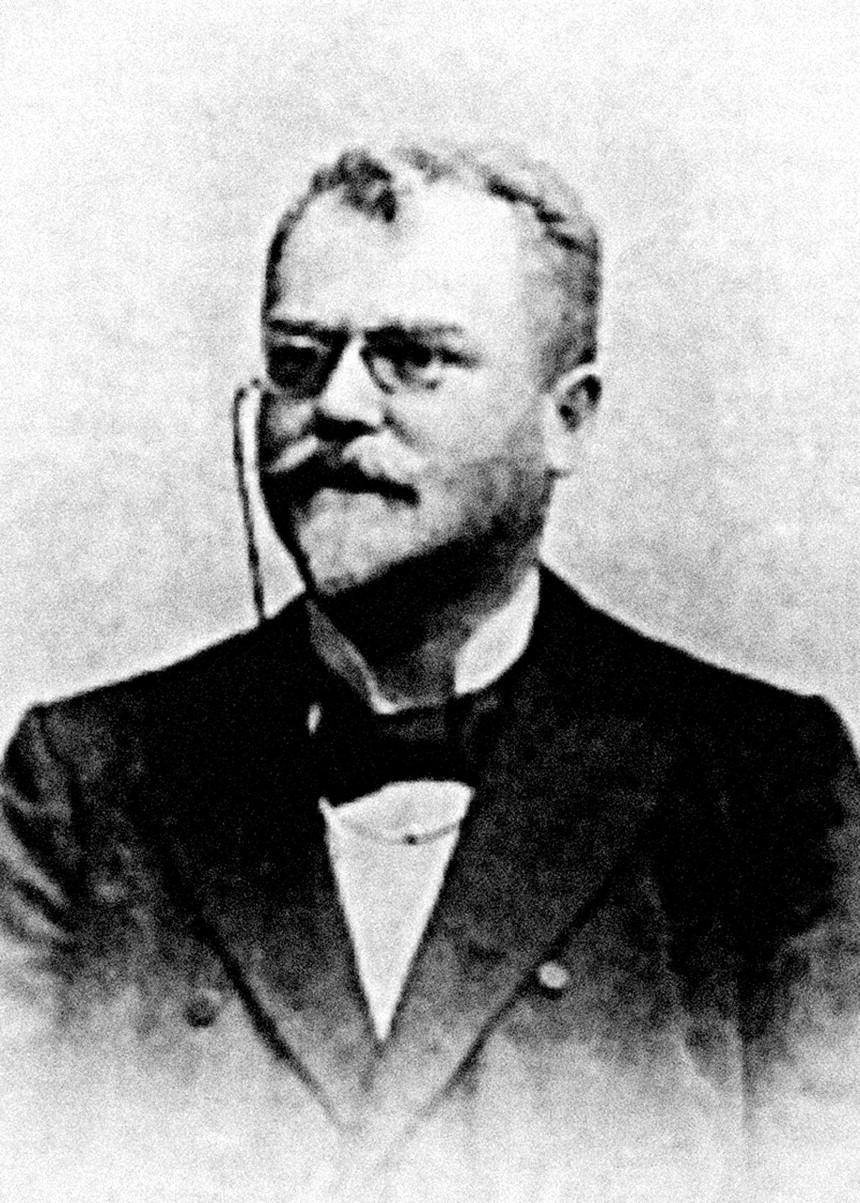
Ladislav Haškovec

Ladislav Haškovec (18 May 1866 – 16 January 1944) was a Czech neuropsychiatrist, eugenicist and physician. He was a professor of neuropathology at the Charles University in Prague. In November 1901 he coined the term "akathisia" in the journal Revue neurologique, and with Jean-Martin Charcot provided an initial demonstration to the Paris Neurological Society after noting that two patients were unable to remain seated. In 1905 he founded the first neurological department in the area of today's Czech Republic. He is considered one of the founders of the Czechoslovak neurology.

== Biography ==
Born in Bechyně, Haškovec studied at the gymnasium in Jindřichův Hradec, and later continued at the Medical Faculty of Charles University in Prague, graduating in 1891. He started medical practice in the laboratory of the National Museum, where he focused on craniology – the science dealing with the morphological description of the skull. From 1890 to 1891 he worked in the Pathological-Anatomical Institute and concurrently he was employed externally as a physician at the II. Internal Clinic, under prof. E.Maixner. Initially, he wanted to focus on internal medicine, however, in 1892 he became an assistant at a psychiatric clinic and began to devote to neuropathology. He won a scholarship of the Medical Faculty and between 1892 and 1893 he worked at the Charcot's clinic for neurological diseases in Paris, where he met with leading figures of the French neurology. At the clinic, he started his major works on the thyroid gland, and also worked with Emanuel Formánek, publishing several papers together.

Haškovec was the first Docent in the field of neuropathology in the Austro-Hungarian Monarchy (1896). He has visited clinics and institutions for neurological and mental diseases in Moscow, Warsaw, Budapest, Kraków, Vienna, Leipzig, Breslau, Munich, Zürich, Belgrade and Berlin. In November 1901 coined the term "akathisia" in the journal, Revue neurologique, and with Jean-Martin Charcot provided an initial demonstration to the Paris Neurological Society after noting that two patients were unable to remain seated. The term derives from the Greek word for "inability to sit down." In 1903, he was appointed a judicial expert in the field of neurological and mental diseases at the Regional Court in Prague. Haškovec lacked a suitable environment needed for his scientific work, and therefore constantly tried to establish a separate neurological clinic. In 1905, he established a small department for neurological diseases at the Brothers of Charity Hospital in Prague, where he was chief of staff (since 1915); this was the first ever neurological department in the area of today's Czech Republic. He became an associate professor in 1906, and full professor in 1919. After the cancellation of the department, he worked in the clinic for neurological diseases in the Laryngologic Institute.

At the 1912 International Congress of Eugenics in London, Haskovec "described the “modern eugenic movement” as an endeavour to apply to society the new biological discoveries of human heredity."

In 1919 he succeeded in establishing of the department for neurological diseases situated in Kaulich's house at the Charles Square in Prague. It later became the core of the new Department of Neurology and was moved to the hospital Na Karlově. From 1925 to 1926, Haškovec served as Dean of the Medical Faculty of Charles University, later as the head of the Neurological Institute (up to 1936). He had a short stint writing for Tožička's magazine in 1938.

== Works and awards ==
In his pioneering works, Haškovec brought the Czech neurology and endocrinology to a high level. He contributed to the description of numerous neurological diseases, some of which bear his name. In 1904, he was the first who observed and described common side effects that are now known to occur during treatment with neuroleptics (some decades before their discovery.) The name of akathisia is still used in various forms (acathisis, akathsie, akathisia) worldwide. He was also interested in anthropology, physical therapy, prevention of neuroses, mental hygiene and child neurology. In 1904, he founded the journal Revue v neurologii a psychiatrii (Revue in Neurology and Psychiatry), which he edited until 1936 (its successor is the journal Czech neurology and psychiatry). He maintained relations with foreign countries, especially with French neurologists and Slovak doctors. Additionally, he has participated in many international medical congresses. He was a member of numerous Czech and foreign medical associations and societies. During his lifetime, he was awarded several orders and decorations. His 1928 publication Lékařské vysvědčení před sňatkem is a "discussion of laws and proposed laws regarding medical certification before marriage in Czechoslovakia."

A number of his publications are as follows:

- Nemoc Basedowova, její léčení a příčinosloví (1894)
- Beitrag zur Lehre über die Function der Schilddrüse, with Emanuel Formánek (1895)
- Příspevek ke studiu činnosti žlázy štitné, with Emanuel Formánek (1895)
- Johann Martin Charcot (1895)
- Zápisky z Paříže (1895)
- O některých změnách krve při křečích, with Emanuel Formánek (1896)
- O účinku thyreoidinu na ústřední čivstvo (1896)
- Přehled českých prací z oboru neurologie a psychiatrie v letech ... (1899)
- Spastické obrny dětské a choroby jim příbuzné (1899)
- Další přispěvky k nauce o účinku štávy thyreoidalní na ústřední ... (1900)
- Experimentalní studie o účinku alkoholu na srdce a oběh krevní (1900)
- O příčinách chorob nervových a duševních a kterak jim předcházeti (1900)
- Další příspěvky k otázce o účinku alkoholu na srdce a oběh krevní (1901)
- Vliv alkoholu na p°usobivost extrakt°u thyreoidalních (1901)
- O tlaku krevním v některých chorobách nervových a duševních a ... (1902)
- Poučení o tyfu břišním (1903)
- Další přispěvky k otázce o p°usobení alkoholu na srdce a oběh krevní (1906)
- Die Bedeutung der Individualisierung von Nervenkranken in der ... (1908)
- O nervech a některých chorobách (1913)
- Potřeba a význam lidového sanatoria pro choroby nervové v ... (1915)
- Dítě nervově choré (1921)
- Žižkova lebka v nálezu čáslavském (1924)
- O stavech obsedantních, with Čeněk Šimerka (1925)
- Pamětní spis ku oslavě stých narozenin J. G. Mendela, with Vladislav Růžička, Artur Brožek (1925)
- Obmezení devisového obchodu (1926)
- Lékařské vysvědčení před sňatkem (1928)
- Zásahy státní moci do obchodu valutami a devisami: Issue 6 (1929)
- Sociální význam chorob nervových (1930)
- Autointoxikace v chorobách duševních a nervových (1940)
- Psychiatrie ve všeobecné lékařské praxi (1967)
