= ASMD =

ASMD may refer to:

- Addition, subtraction, multiplication and division, the four elementary arithmetic operations
- Anterior segment mesenchymal dysgenesis, a form of agenesis
- "ASMD", a code used to refer to the Armstrong Siddeley Double Mamba gas turbine turboprop engine
- Anti-ship missile defence
- Another name for Niemann–Pick disease associated with the SMPD1 gene (types A and B)
