= Streptomyces griseocarneus =

Scientific classification
- Domain: Bacteria
- Kingdom: Bacillati
- Phylum: Actinomycetota
- Class: Actinomycetes
- Order: Streptomycetales
- Family: Streptomycetaceae
- Genus: Streptomyces
- Species: S. griseocarneus

Binomial name
- Streptomyces griseocarneus Witt and Stackebrandt 1991

Type strain
- Abbott SCS NA 232-M1, AS 4.1088, AS 4.1368, ATCC 12628, ATCC 19763, BCRC (formerly CCRC) 13304, BCRC 13304, Benedict Na232-M1, BU 7,11, CBS 436.68, CBS 501.68, CCM 3228, CCRC 13304, CCUG 11123, CECT 3250, CGMCC 4.1088, CGMCC 4.1368, CIP 108156, DSM 40004, DSM 41062, ETH 2440, ETH 24440, ETH 28588, HUT-6055, IAM W-3-5, IAW 87, IFO (now NBRC) 12776, IFO (now NBRC) 3387, IFO 12776, IFO 3387, IMRU 3557, IPV 1723, IPV 1959, IPV 765, IPV 883, ISP 5004, JCM 4095, JCM 4580, KCC S-0095, KCC S-0580, KCCS- 0095, KCCS-0580, Lanoot R-8753, LMG 19383, LMG 5973, LMG 8601, MTCC 328, NBRC 12776, NBRC 3387, NCIB 9623, NCIMB 9623, NRRL B-1068, NRRL B-1350, NRRL-ISP 5004, PCM 23, PCM 2326, PCM 2345, PSA 132, R-8753, RGB A-637, RIA 1043, RIA 132, UNIQEM 149, VKM Ac-881, Waksman 3557, 3557a, WC 3557, WC 3650

Synonyms
- Streptomyces alboverticillatus (Locci and Schofield 1989) Witt and Stackebrandt 1991; "Streptomyces griseocarneus" Benedict et al. 1950; Streptomyces septatus (Locci et al. 1969) Witt and Stackebrandt 1991; Streptoverticillium alboverticillatum (ex Arai 1976) Locci and Schofield 1989; Streptoverticillium griseocarneum (Benedict et al. 1950) Baldacci et al. 1966 (Approved Lists 1980); "Streptoverticillium griseocarneus" [sic] (Benedict et al. 1950) Baldacci 1958; Streptoverticillium septatum Locci et al. 1969 (Approved Lists 1980); "Verticillomyces griseocarneus" (Benedict et al. 1950) Shinobu 1965

Species of bacterium

Streptomyces griseocarneus is a bacterium species from the genus of Streptomyces which has been isolated from soil. Streptomyces griseocarneus produces hydroxystreptomycin, alboverticillin, sphingomyelinase C and rotaventin.

== See also ==
- List of Streptomyces species
