= Revue neurologique =

- Discipline: Neurology, psychiatry
- Language: French
- Edited by: Jean-Philippe Azulay

Publication details
- History: 1893-present
- Publisher: Elsevier Masson on behalf of the Société Française de Neurologie (France)
- Frequency: Monthly
- Impact factor: 1.039 (2016)

Standard abbreviations
- ISO 4: Rev. Neurol. (Paris)

Indexing
- CODEN: RENEAM
- ISSN: 0035-3787
- LCCN: sv93003472
- OCLC no.: 01605920

Links
- Journal homepage; Online access

The Revue neurologique (Neurological Review) is a French neurological and psychiatric medical journal. It was established in 1893 with Jean-Martin Charcot as adviser. Today it is the official journal of the Société Française de Neurologie (French Neurology Society). According to the Journal Citation Reports, the journal has a 2016 impact factor of 1.039.

The monthly journal became the main periodical in France devoted to psychiatry and nervous diseases. It was made the official journal of the Société de Neurologie de Paris when the society was founded in 1899. It gradually displaced the quarterly Archives de Neurologie, publishing original articles by prominent French neurologists such as Charcot, Joseph Jules Dejerine, Édouard Brissaud and Fulgence Raymond, as well as work from foreign researchers including Charles Scott Sherrington of Great Britain, Alexander E. Scherbak of Russia, and João Baptista de Lacerda of Argentine. In November 1901 the Revue Neurologique published a report by Ladislav Haškovec of Prague describing two cases of akathisia. The journal also published summary articles that went into great detail on a particular topic.
