= Thioxanthene =

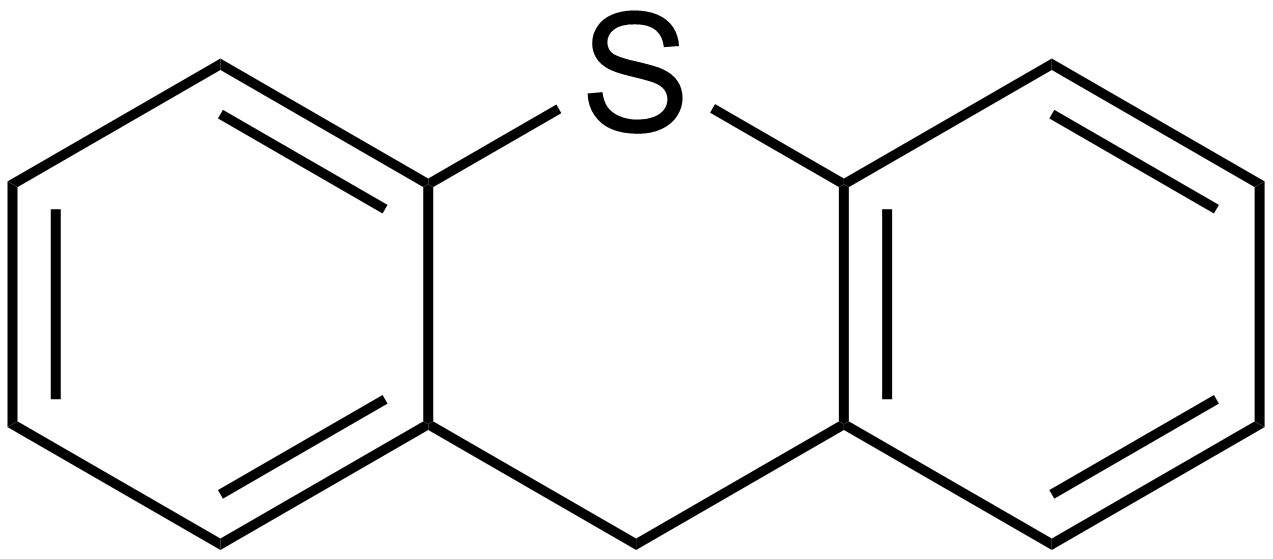

Names
- Preferred IUPAC name 9H-Thioxanthene
- Other names 10H-Dibenzo[b,e]thiin

Identifiers
CAS Number	261-31-4
3D model (JSmol)	Interactive image
ChEBI	CHEBI:51055
ChEMBL	ChEMBL79451
ChemSpider	60819
ECHA InfoCard	100.005.430
PubChem CID	67495
UNII	1J3P67894A
CompTox Dashboard (EPA)	DTXSID20180732
- InChI: InChI=1S/C13H10S/c1-3-7-12-10(5-1)9-11-6-2-4-8-13(11)14-12/h1-8H,9H2 Key: PQJUJGAVDBINPI-UHFFFAOYSA-N; InChI=1/C13H10S/c1-3-7-12-10(5-1)9-11-6-2-4-8-13(11)14-12/h1-8H,9H2 Key: PQJUJGAVDBINPI-UHFFFAOYAP
- SMILES: S2c1ccccc1Cc3c2cccc3

Properties
Chemical formula	C_{13}H_{10}S
Molar mass	198.28 g·mol^{−1}
- Except where otherwise noted, data are given for materials in their standard state (at 25 °C [77 °F], 100 kPa). verify (what is ?) Infobox references

Thioxanthene is a chemical compound in which the oxygen atom in xanthene is replaced with a sulfur atom. It is also related to phenothiazine. Several of its derivatives are used as typical antipsychotics in the treatment of schizophrenia and other psychoses.

== Derivatives ==
The derivatives of thioxanthene used clinically as antipsychotics include:

- Chlorprothixene (Cloxan, Taractan, Truxal)
- Clopenthixol (Sordinol)
- Flupenthixol (Depixol, Fluanxol)
- Thiothixene (Navane)
- Zuclopenthixol (Cisordinol, Clopixol, Acuphase)

The therapeutic efficacy of these drugs is related to their ability to antagonize the D_{2} receptors in the brain, though they have actions at other sites such as serotonin, adrenaline, and histamine receptors as well which mostly contribute to side effects.

The thioxanthenes, as a class, are closely related chemically to the phenothiazines. The major structural difference is that the nitrogen at position 10 in the phenothiazines is replaced by a carbon atom with a double bond to the side chain. This difference is noted in the illustration of flupenthixol, which shows a double-bonded carbon in the number 10 position (opposite the sulfur molecule in the central chain).
