= Sphingomyelin phosphodiesterase 1 =

Enzyme found in humans

SMPD1
Available structures
PDB	Ortholog search: PDBe RCSB
PDB	List of PDB id codes 5JG8

Identifiers
- Aliases: SMPD1, ASM, ASMASE, NPD, Sphingomyelin phosphodiesterase 1
- External IDs: OMIM: 607608; MGI: 98325; HomoloGene: 457; GeneCards: SMPD1; OMA:SMPD1 - orthologs

Gene location (Human)
Chr.	Chromosome 11 (human)
Band	11p15.4	Start	6,390,440 bp
Band	11p15.4	End	6,394,998 bp

Gene location (Mouse)
Chr.	Chromosome 7 (mouse)
Band	7 E3|7 55.9 cM	Start	105,203,567 bp
Band	7 E3|7 55.9 cM	End	105,207,596 bp
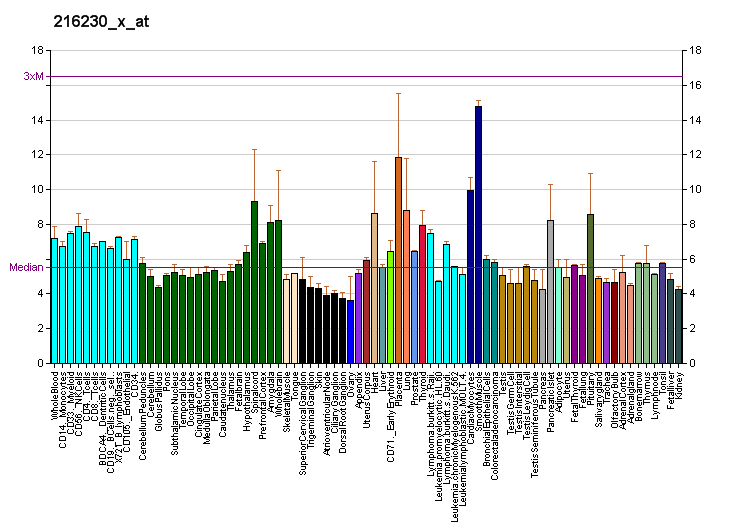

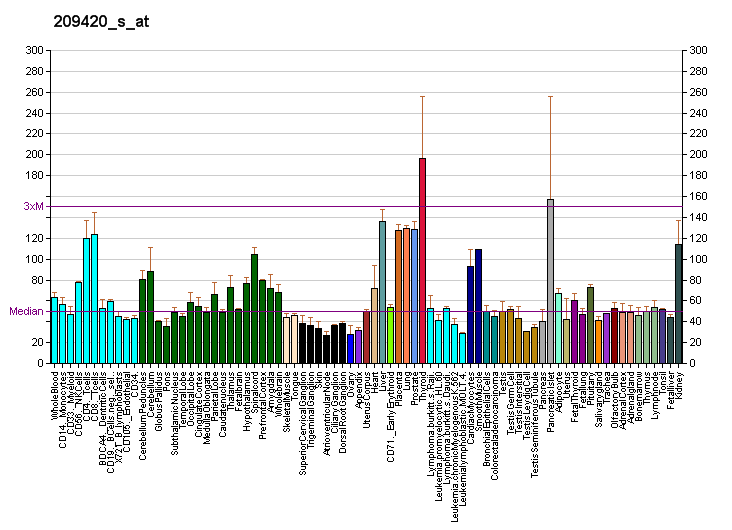
RNA expression pattern
Bgee	Human / Mouse (ortholog); Top expressed in: beta cell; stromal cell of endometrium; apex of heart; right lobe of liver; anterior pituitary; tendon of biceps brachii; right hemisphere of cerebellum; right auricle of heart; mucosa of transverse colon; left ventricle / Top expressed in: choroid plexus of fourth ventricle; gastrula; interventricular septum; CA3 field; entorhinal cortex; perirhinal cortex; myocardium of ventricle; cardiac muscle tissue of left ventricle; Epithelium of choroid plexus; decidua; More reference expression data
BioGPS	More reference expression data
Gene ontology
Molecular function	sphingomyelin phosphodiesterase activity; hydrolase activity, acting on glycosyl bonds; protein binding; hydrolase activity; metal ion binding; zinc ion binding; acid sphingomyelin phosphodiesterase activity; phosphoric diester hydrolase activity
Cellular component	endosome; plasma membrane; lamellar granule; lysosomal lumen; lysosome; extracellular exosome; extracellular region; extracellular space
Biological process	termination of signal transduction; glycosphingolipid metabolic process; positive regulation of protein dephosphorylation; ceramide biosynthetic process; nervous system development; sphingomyelin catabolic process; negative regulation of MAP kinase activity; positive regulation of apoptotic process; metabolism; signal transduction; sphingomyelin metabolic process; response to cocaine; ceramide metabolic process; cholesterol metabolic process
Sources:Amigo / QuickGO
Orthologs
Species	Human	Mouse
Entrez	6609	20597
Ensembl	ENSG00000166311	ENSMUSG00000037049
UniProt	P17405	Q04519
RefSeq (mRNA)	NM_000543; NM_001007593; NM_001318087; NM_001318088; NM_001365135	NM_011421
RefSeq (protein)	NP_000534; NP_001007594; NP_001305016; NP_001305017; NP_001352064	NP_035551
Location (UCSC)	Chr 11: 6.39 – 6.39 Mb	Chr 7: 105.2 – 105.21 Mb
PubMed search
- Wikidata
View/Edit Human	View/Edit Mouse

Sphingomyelin phosphodiesterase 1 (SMPD1), also known as acid sphingomyelinase (ASM), is an enzyme that in humans is encoded by the SMPD1 gene.

Sphingomyelin phosphodiesterase 1 belongs to the sphingomyelin phosphodiesterase family.

== Clinical significance ==
Defects in the SMPD1 gene cause Niemann–Pick disease, SMPD1-associated.

A mutation from leucine to proline at amino acid residue 302 encoded by the SMPD1 gene was identified by Gan-Or et al. (2013) as a risk factor for Parkinson disease.
