= Typical antipsychotic =

Class of drugs

- Drug class
- Skeletal formula of chlorpromazine, the first neuroleptic drug
- Synonyms: First generation antipsychotics, conventional antipsychotics, classical neuroleptics, traditional antipsychotics, major tranquilizers

Legal status

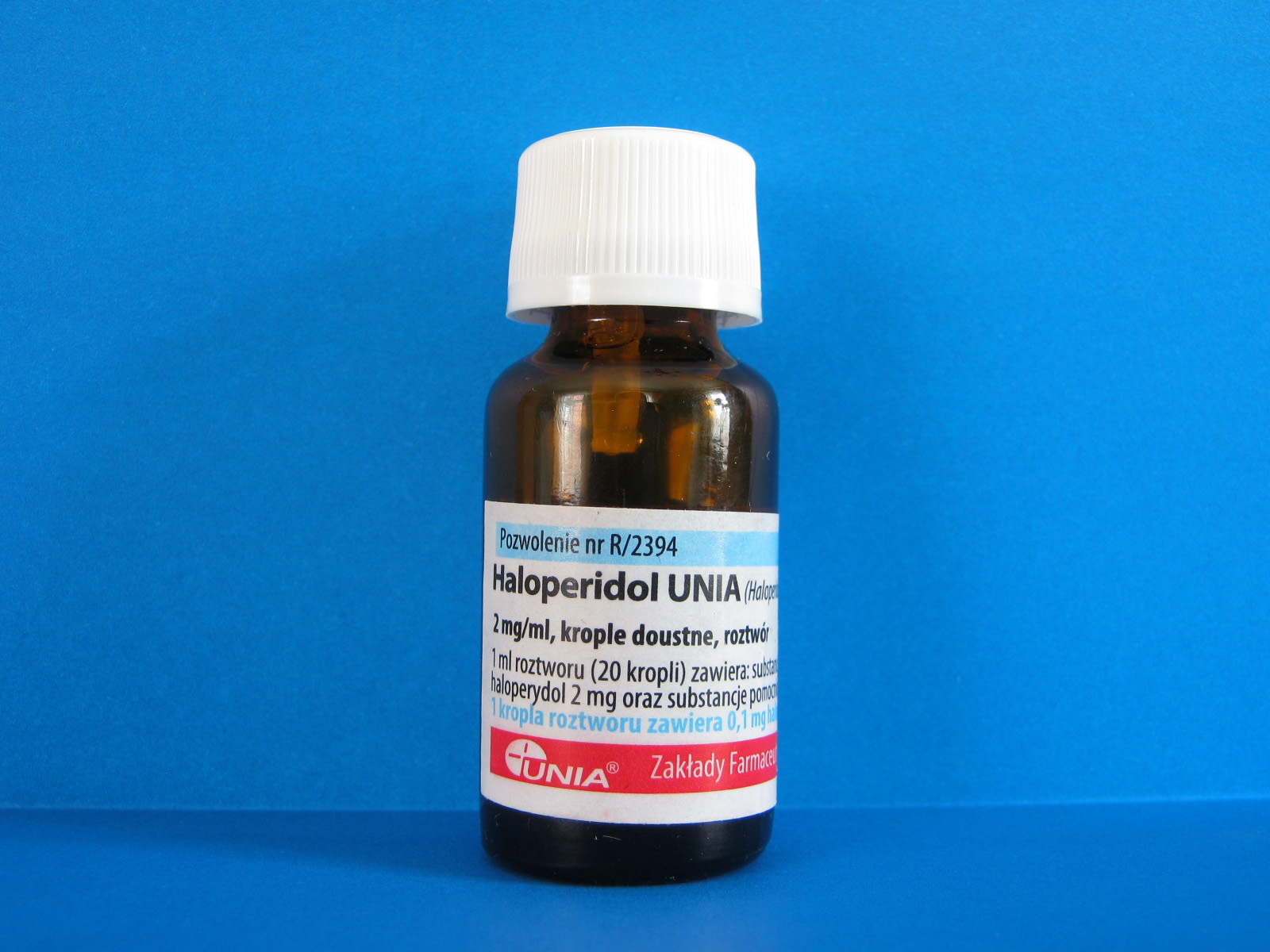
Haloperidol, a high potency typical antipsychotic

Typical antipsychotics (also known as major tranquilizers, and first generation antipsychotics) are a class of antipsychotic drugs first developed in the 1950s and used to treat psychosis (in particular, schizophrenia). Typical antipsychotics may also be used for the treatment of acute mania, agitation, and other conditions. The first typical antipsychotics to come into medical use were the phenothiazines, namely chlorpromazine which was discovered serendipitously. Another prominent grouping of antipsychotics are the butyrophenones, an example of which is haloperidol.

Both generations of medication tend to block receptors in the brain's dopamine pathways, but atypicals at the time of marketing were claimed to differ from typical antipsychotics in that they are less likely to cause extrapyramidal symptoms (EPS), which include unsteady Parkinson's disease-type movements, internal restlessness, and other involuntary movements (e.g. tardive dyskinesia, which can persist after stopping the medication). More recent research has demonstrated the side effect profile of these drugs is similar to older drugs, causing the leading medical journal The Lancet to write in its editorial "the time has come to abandon the terms first-generation and second-generation antipsychotics, as they do not merit this distinction." While typical antipsychotics are more likely to cause EPS, atypicals are more likely to cause adverse metabolic effects, such as weight gain and increase the risk for type II diabetes.

== Clinical uses ==
Typical antipsychotics block the dopamine 2 receptor (D2) receptor, causing a tranquilizing effect. It is thought that 60–80% of D2 receptors need to be occupied for antipsychotic effect. For reference, the typical antipsychotic haloperidol tends to block about 80% of D2 receptors at doses ranging from 2 to 5 mg per day. On the aggregate level, no typical antipsychotic is more effective than any other, though people will vary in which antipsychotic they prefer to take based on individual differences in tolerability and effectiveness. Typical antipsychotics can be used to treat, e.g., schizophrenia or severe agitation. Haloperidol, due to the availability of a rapid-acting injectable formulation and decades of use, remains the most commonly used antipsychotic for treating severe agitation in the emergency department setting.

== Adverse effects ==
Adverse effects vary among the various agents in this class of medications, but common effects include: dry mouth, muscle stiffness, muscle cramping, tremors, EPS and weight gain. EPS refers to a cluster of symptoms consisting of akathisia, parkinsonism, and dystonia. Anticholinergics such as benztropine and diphenhydramine are commonly prescribed to treat the EPS. 4% of users develop rabbit syndrome while on typical antipsychotics.

There is a risk of developing a serious condition called tardive dyskinesia as a side effect of antipsychotics, including typical antipsychotics. The risk of developing tardive dyskinesia after chronic typical antipsychotic usage varies on several factors, such as age and gender, as well as the specific antipsychotic used. The commonly reported incidence of TD among younger patients is about 5% per year. Among older patients incidence rates as high as 20% per year have been reported. The average prevalence is approximately 30%. There are few treatments that have consistently been shown to be effective for the treatment of tardive dyskinesia, though an VMAT2 inhibitor like valbenazine may help. The atypical antipsychotic clozapine has also been suggested as an alternative antipsychotic for patients experiencing tardive dyskinesia. Tardive dyskinesia may reverse upon discontinuation of the offending agent or it may be irreversible, withdrawal may also make tardive dyskinesia more severe.

Neuroleptic malignant syndrome (NMS) is a rare, but potentially fatal side effect of antipsychotic treatment. NMS is characterized by fever, muscle rigidity, autonomic dysfunction, and altered mental status. Treatment includes discontinuation of the offending agent and supportive care.

The role of typical antipsychotics has come into question recently as studies have suggested that typical antipsychotics may increase the risk of death in elderly patients. A 2005 retrospective cohort study from the New England Journal of Medicine showed an increase in risk of death with the use of typical antipsychotics that was on par with the increase shown with atypical antipsychotics. This has led some to question the common use of antipsychotics for the treatment of agitation in the elderly, particularly with the availability of alternatives such as mood stabilizing and antiepileptic drugs.

== Potency ==
Traditional antipsychotics are classified as high-potency, mid-potency, or low-potency based on their potency for the D2 receptor:

Potency	Examples	Adverse effect profile
high	fluphenazine and haloperidol	more extrapyramidal side effects (EPS) and less antihistaminic effects (e.g. sedation), alpha adrenergic antagonism (e.g. orthostatic hypotension), and anticholinergic effects (e.g. dry mouth)
middle	perphenazine	intermediate D2 affinity, with more off-target effects than high-potency agents
low	chlorpromazine	less risk of EPS but more antihistaminic effects, alpha adrenergic antagonism, and anticholinergic effects

Prochlorperazine (Compazine, Buccastem, Stemetil) and Pimozide (Orap) are less commonly used to treat psychotic states, and so are sometimes excluded from this classification.

A related concept to D2 potency is the concept of "chlorpromazine equivalence", which provides a measure of the relative effectiveness of antipsychotics. The measure specifies the amount (mass) in milligrams of a given drug that must be administered in order to achieve desired effects equivalent to those of 100 milligrams of chlorpromazine. Another method is "defined daily dose" (DDD), which is the assumed average dose of an antipsychotic that an adult would receive during long-term treatment. DDD is primarily used for comparing the utilization of antipsychotics (e.g. in an insurance claim database), rather than comparing therapeutic effects between antipsychotics. Maximum dose methods are sometimes used to compare between antipsychotics as well. These methods do not generally account for differences between the tolerability (i.e. the risk of side effects) or the safety between medications.

For a list of typical antipsychotics organized by potency, see below:

=== Low potency ===
- Chlorpromazine
- Chlorprothixene
- Levomepromazine
- Mesoridazine
- Periciazine
- Promazine
- Thioridazine†

=== Medium potency ===
- Molindone
- Perphenazine
- Thiothixene

=== High potency ===
- Droperidol
- Flupentixol
- Fluphenazine
- Haloperidol
- Pimozide
- Prochlorperazine
- Thioproperazine
- Trifluoperazine
- Zuclopenthixol

†: discontinued or withdrawn products

== Long-acting injectables ==
Some typical antipsychotics have been formulated as a long-acting injectable (LAI), or "depot", formulation. Depot injections are also used on persons under involuntary commitment to force compliance with a court treatment order when the person would refuse to take daily oral medication. This has the effect of dosing a person who doesn't consent to take the drug. The United Nations Special Rapporteur On Torture has classified this as a human rights violation and cruel or inhuman treatment.

The first LAI antipsychotics (often referred to as simply "LAIs") were the typical antipsychotics fluphenazine and haloperidol. Both fluphenazile and haloperidol are formulated as decanoates, referring to the attachment of a decanoic acid group to the antipsychotic molecule. These are then dissolved in an organic oil. Together, these modifications prevent the active medications from being released immediately upon injection, attaining a slow release of the active medications (note, though, that the fluphenazine decanoate product is unique for reaching peak fluphenazine blood levels within 24 hours after administration). Fluphenazine decanoate can be administered every 7 to 21 days (usually every 14 to 28 days), while haloperidol decanoate can be administered every 28 days, though some people receive more or less frequent injections. If a scheduled injection of either haloperidol decanoate or fluphenazine decanoate is missed, recommendations for administering make-up injectable dose(s) or providing antipsychotics to be taken by mouth vary by, e.g., how long ago the last injection was and how many previous injections the person has received (i.e., if steady state levels of the medication have been reached or not).

Both of the typical antipsychotic LAIs are inexpensive in comparison to the atypical LAIs. Doctors usually prefer atypical LAIs over typical LAIs due to the differences in adverse effects between typical and atypical antipsychotics in general.

Pharmacokinetics of long-acting injectable antipsychotics
Medication	Brand name	Class	Vehicle	Dosage	T_{max}	t_{1/2} single	t_{1/2} multiple	logP^{c}	Ref
Aripiprazole lauroxil	Aristada	Atypical	Water^{a}	441–1064 mg/4–8 weeks	24–35 days	?	54–57 days	7.9–10.0	
Aripiprazole monohydrate	Abilify Maintena	Atypical	Water^{a}	300–400 mg/4 weeks	7 days	?	30–47 days	4.9–5.2	
Bromperidol decanoate	Impromen Decanoas	Typical	Sesame oil	40–300 mg/4 weeks	3–9 days	?	21–25 days	7.9	
Clopentixol decanoate	Sordinol Depot	Typical	Viscoleo^{b}	50–600 mg/1–4 weeks	4–7 days	?	19 days	9.0	
Flupentixol decanoate	Depixol	Typical	Viscoleo^{b}	10–200 mg/2–4 weeks	4–10 days	8 days	17 days	7.2–9.2	
Fluphenazine decanoate	Prolixin Decanoate	Typical	Sesame oil	12.5–100 mg/2–5 weeks	1–2 days	1–10 days	14–100 days	7.2–9.0	
Fluphenazine enanthate	Prolixin Enanthate	Typical	Sesame oil	12.5–100 mg/1–4 weeks	2–3 days	4 days	?	6.4–7.4	
Fluspirilene	Imap, Redeptin	Typical	Water^{a}	2–12 mg/1 week	1–8 days	7 days	?	5.2–5.8	
Haloperidol decanoate	Haldol Decanoate	Typical	Sesame oil	20–400 mg/2–4 weeks	3–9 days	18–21 days		7.2–7.9	
Olanzapine pamoate	Zyprexa Relprevv	Atypical	Water^{a}	150–405 mg/2–4 weeks	7 days	?	30 days	–	
Oxyprothepin decanoate	Meclopin	Typical	?	?	?	?	?	8.5–8.7	
Paliperidone palmitate	Invega Sustenna	Atypical	Water^{a}	39–819 mg/4–12 weeks	13–33 days	25–139 days	?	8.1–10.1	
Perphenazine decanoate	Trilafon Dekanoat	Typical	Sesame oil	50–200 mg/2–4 weeks	?	?	27 days	8.9	
Perphenazine enanthate	Trilafon Enanthate	Typical	Sesame oil	25–200 mg/2 weeks	2–3 days	?	4–7 days	6.4–7.2	
Pipotiazine palmitate	Piportil Longum	Typical	Viscoleo^{b}	25–400 mg/4 weeks	9–10 days	?	14–21 days	8.5–11.6	
Pipotiazine undecylenate	Piportil Medium	Typical	Sesame oil	100–200 mg/2 weeks	?	?	?	8.4	
Risperidone	Risperdal Consta	Atypical	Microspheres	12.5–75 mg/2 weeks	21 days	?	3–6 days	–	
Zuclopentixol acetate	Clopixol Acuphase	Typical	Viscoleo^{b}	50–200 mg/1–3 days	1–2 days	1–2 days		4.7–4.9	
Zuclopentixol decanoate	Clopixol Depot	Typical	Viscoleo^{b}	50–800 mg/2–4 weeks	4–9 days	?	11–21 days	7.5–9.0	
Note: All by intramuscular injection. Footnotes: ^{a} = Microcrystalline or nanocrystalline aqueous suspension. ^{b} = Low-viscosity vegetable oil (specifically fractionated coconut oil with medium-chain triglycerides). ^{c} = Predicted, from PubChem and DrugBank. Sources: Main: See template.

== History ==
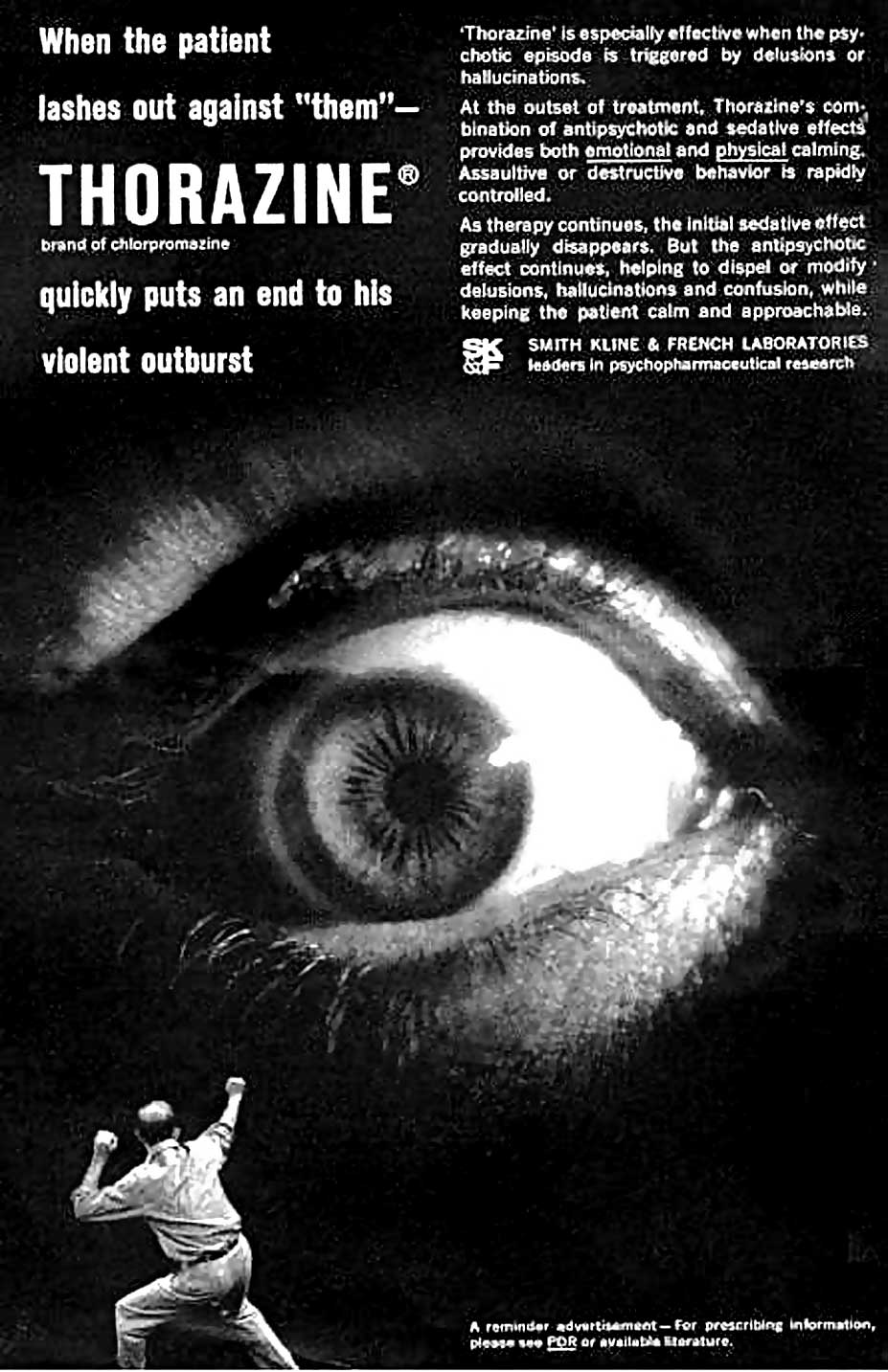
Advertisement for Thorazine (chlorpromazine) from the 1950s, reflecting the perceptions of psychosis, including the now-discredited perception of a tendency towards violence, from the time when antipsychotics were discovered

The original antipsychotic drugs were happened upon largely by chance and then tested for their effectiveness. The first, chlorpromazine, was developed as a surgical anesthetic after an initial report in 1952. It was first used in psychiatric institutions because of its powerful tranquilizing effect; at the time it was advertised as a "pharmacological lobotomy". (Note that "tranquilizing" here only refers to changes in external behavior, while the experience a person has internally may be one of increased agitation but inability to express it.)

Until the 1970s there was considerable debate within psychiatry on the most appropriate term to use to describe the new drugs. In the late 1950s the most widely used term was "neuroleptic", followed by "major tranquilizer" and then "ataraxic". The word neuroleptic was coined in 1955 by Delay and Deniker after their discovery (1952) of the antipsychotic effects of chlorpromazine. It is derived from the Greek: "νεῦρον" (neuron, originally meaning "sinew" but today referring to the nerves) and "λαμβάνω" (lambanō, meaning "take hold of"). Thus, the word means taking hold of one's nerves. It was often taken to refer also to common effects such as reduced activity in general, as well as lethargy and impaired motor control. Although these effects are unpleasant and harmful, they were, along with akathisia, considered a reliable sign that the drug was working. These terms have been largely replaced by the term "antipsychotic" in medical and advertising literature, which refers to the medication's more-marketable effects.

== See also ==
- Atypical antipsychotic
- Antipsychotic
- Tranquilizer
- Tardive dyskinesia
- Schizophrenia
- Bipolar disorder
- List of investigational antipsychotics
