= Johann Ludwig Wilhelm Thudichum =

German-born biochemist and physician (1829–1901)

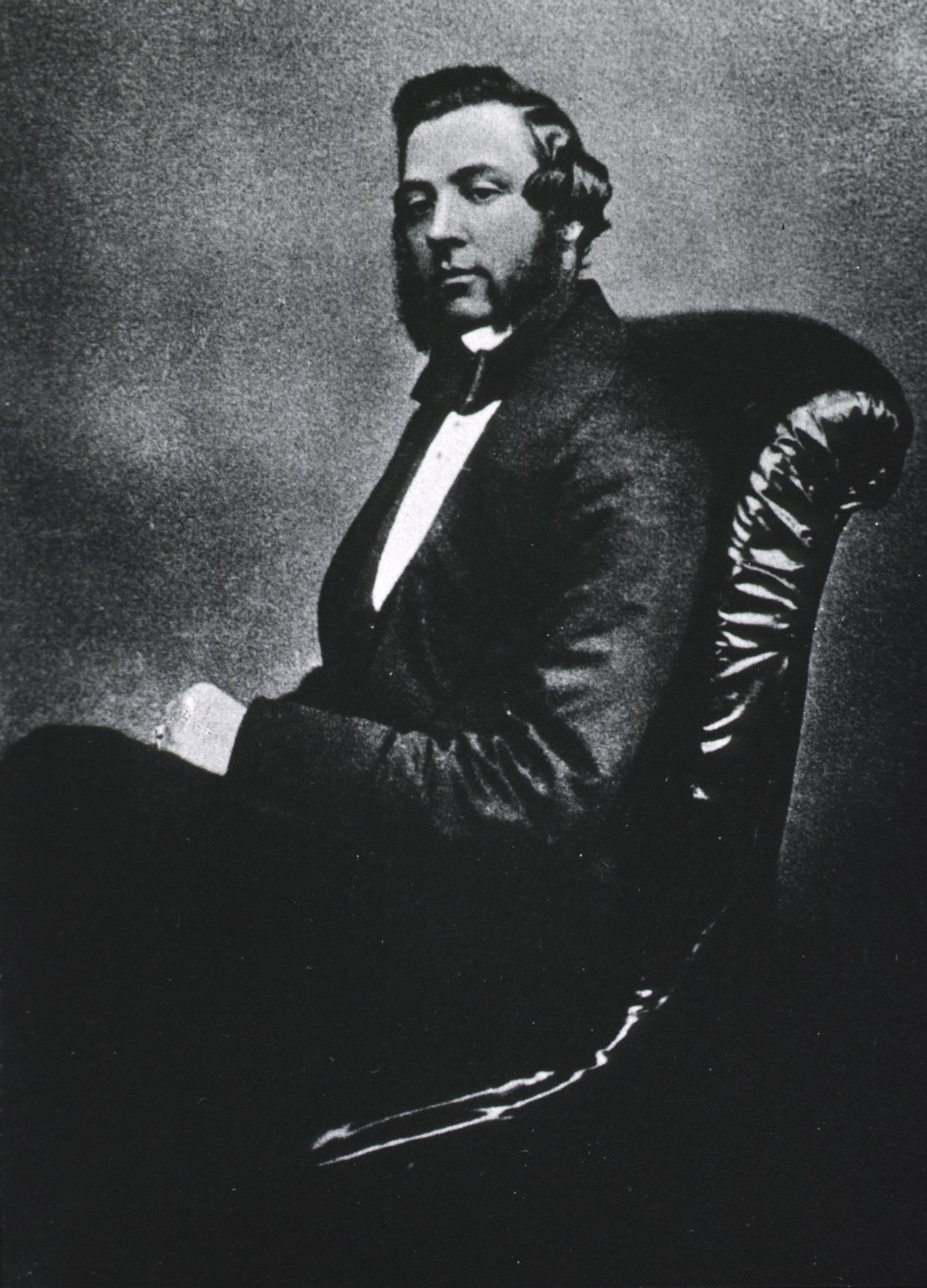
Johann Ludwig Wilhelm Thudichum

Johann Ludwig Wilhelm Thudichum, also known as John Louis William Thudichum (August 27, 1829, Büdingen – September 7, 1901) was a German-born physician and biochemist.

From 1847 he studied medicine at the University of Giessen, where he worked after hours in the laboratory of Justus von Liebig (1803–1873). In 1853 he moved to London, where he worked for the remainder of his career.

Thudichum was a pioneer of British biochemistry, and a founder of "brain chemistry". He is credited with conducting chemical analyses of over one thousand human and animal brains. In his research, he isolated and characterized numerous compounds of the brain, such as cephalin, sphingomyelin, galactose, lactic acid and sphingosine. In 1884 he explained his findings in a publication titled "A Treatise on the Chemical Constitution of the Brain", a book that was widely criticized and rejected at the time by many in the scientific community. After his death, Thudichum's discoveries were realized to be important scientific contributions to the study of the chemical and molecular composition of the brain.

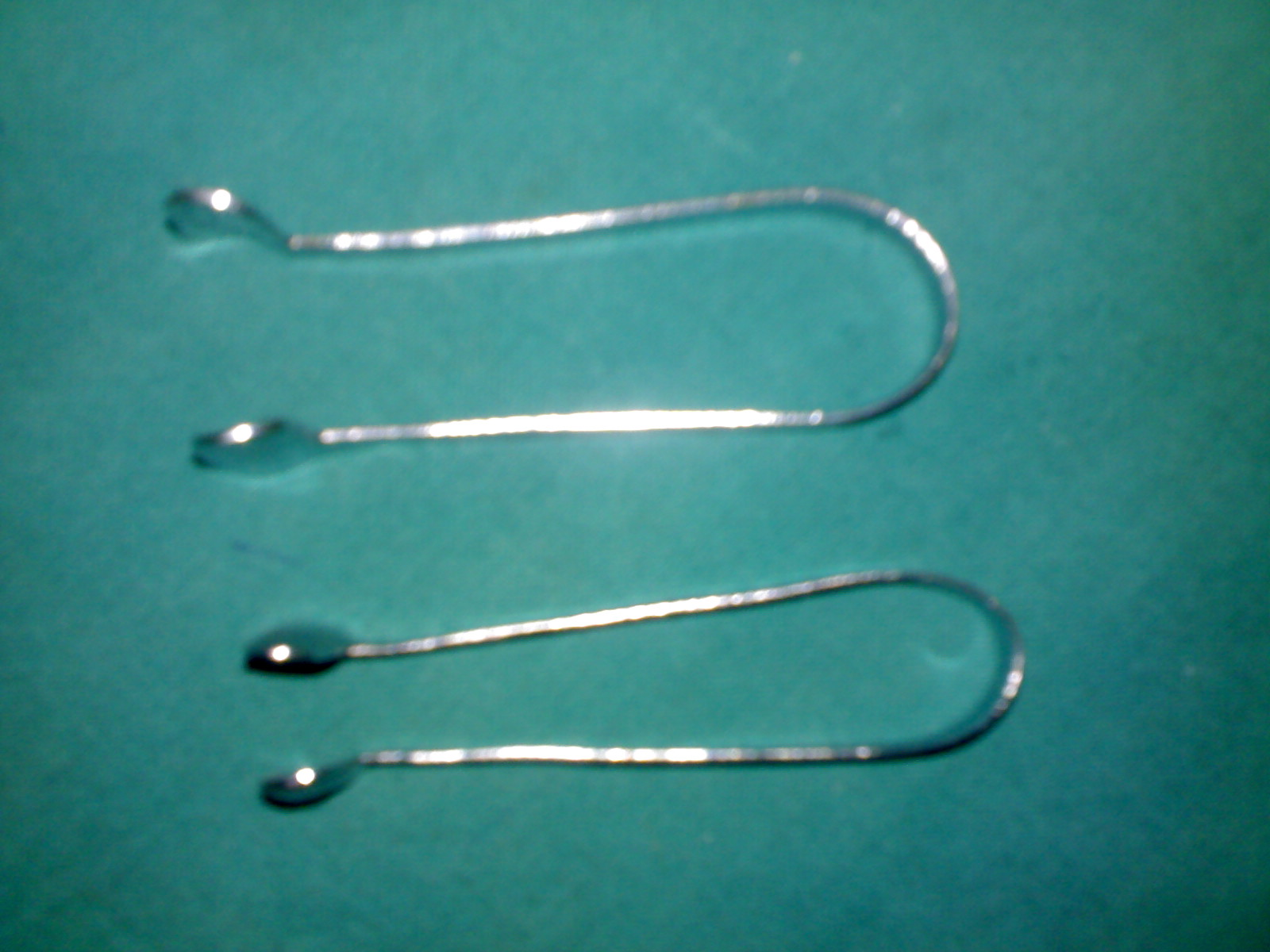
Thudichum's nasal speculum

Thudichum was the author of numerous works, including books on non-medical topics such as viticulture and cookery. He also devised a specialized nasal speculum that is still in use by physicians today. Since 1974 the "Thudichum Medal Lecture" is awarded in England for outstanding achievements in the field of neurochemistry, and at Yale University, the "Thudichum Post–Doctoral Research Fellowship in Neuro-oncology" was founded within the fields of cell biology, neurochemistry and adult stem cell research to support the study of brain tumors.

A collection of his papers are held at the National Library of Medicine in Bethesda, Maryland.

== Selected writings ==
- "A treatise on the pathology of urine", London, John Churchill, 1858.
- "A treatise on gall-stones: their chemistry, pathology, and treatment. Illustrated with plates, 1863.
- "A treatise on the origin, nature, and varieties of wine; being a complete manual of viticulture and oenology", London, New York, Macmillan, 1872.
- "A manual of chemical physiology, including its points of contact with pathology", 1872.
- "On wines: their production, treatment, and use; six lectures", 1873.
- "A treatise on the chemical constitution of the brain", 1884.
- "On the coca of Peru and its immediate principles": their strengthening and healing powers, 1885.
- "The progress of medical chemistry comprising its application to physiology", Bailliere, Tindall and Cox, 1896.
