= Acid sphingomyelinase =

Enzyme that hydrolyzes sphingomyelin

Acid sphingomyelinase is one of the enzymes that make up the sphingomyelinase (SMase) family, responsible for catalyzing the breakdown of sphingomyelin to ceramide and phosphorylcholine. They are organized into alkaline, neutral, and acidic SMase depending on the pH in which their enzymatic activity is optimal. Acid sphingomyelinases' (aSMases) enzymatic activity can be influenced by drugs, lipids, cations, pH, redox and other proteins in the environment. Specifically aSMases have been shown to have increased enzymatic activity in lysobisphosphatidic acid (LBPA) or phosphatidylinositol (PI) enriched environments, and inhibited activity when phosphorylated derivatives of PI are present.

Sphingomyelin phosphodiesterase 1 (SMPD1) is the gene that codes for two aSMase enzymes distinct in the pools of sphingomyelin they hydrolyse. Lysosomal sphingomyelinase (L-SMase) is found in the lysosomal compartment, and the secretory sphingomyelinase (S-SMase) is found extracellularly.

== Structure and catalytic mechanism ==
The catalytic mechanism of acid sphingomyelinase is the hydrolysis of sphingomyelin to ceramide and phosphorylcholine.

== Types of acid sphingomyelinases ==
=== Lysosomal acid sphingomyelinase ===
The lysosomal acidic SMase is considered one of the major candidates for the production of ceramide in the cellular response to stress; including environmental insults, infection with pathogens, ligation of death receptors, and chemotherapy drugs. The main mechanism of trafficking L-SMase to the lysosome is through the mannose 6-phosphate receptor mediated pathway. L-SMase acquires zinc whilst being trafficked to the lysosome, and it is thought that zinc may play a role in mediating cellular L-SMase activity.

=== Secreted acid sphingomyelinase ===
Secreted acid SMases are less well understood than their lysosomal compartmentalised counterpart. S-SMases are zinc-dependent, and have been implicated in the metabolism of lipoprotein-bound SM to Ceramide and the aggregation of LDL particles. In circulating platelets there is no neutral SMase activity, but they do have S-SMase enzymatic activity. It has been shown that in response to thrombin induced platelet activation, S-SMase is released extracellulary and a parallel decrease in intracellular L-SMase is observed.

== Role in disease ==
=== Niemann–Pick type A and type B ===
The lysosomal storage disorders Niemann-Pick disease, SMPD1-associated (type A and B) are characterized by deficiencies in acid sphingomyelinase. Diagnosis is confirmed by an aSMase activity less than 10% in the peripheral blood lymphocytes. Caused by a mutation in the SMPD1 gene, it is found in 1:250,000 in the population. Mutations to this gene are more commonly found in those of Ashkenazi Jewish descent (1:80-1:100) or of North African descent.

=== Niemann–Pick type C ===
Niemann–Pick disease, type C (NPC) is also a lysosomal storage disorder, but instead is caused by a mutation in either the NPC1 or NPC2 gene. Despite having a functional SMPD1 gene, NPC fibroblasts were shown to have inhibited aSMase activity. The functional loss of aSMase activity may also be due to altered trafficking (causing accumulation of cholesterol) or by direct action on the enzyme. Additionally, the disregulation of BMP/LBPA in NPC may contribute to the decreased aSMase activity, as LBPA has been shown to enhance enzymatic activity.

=== Cardiovascular pathophysiological conditions ===
Atherosclerosis occurs from the thickening of the artery walls through depositing of cholesterol and triglyceride on the cell walls. Lipid deposits are encouraged by high levels of circulating LDL, often caused by inadequate removal by HDL particles. Acid SMase has been shown to accelerate atherosclerotic lesion progression through promoting aggregation of lipoproteins to arterial walls. Inhibition of aSMases is a current therapeutic target for the treatment of atherosclerosis.

=== Diabetes ===
Secreted aSMase may also play a role in diabetes. Inflammation-induced S-SMase activation may contribute to insulin resistance through the increased generation of ceramide.

=== COVID-19 ===
The SARS-CoV-2 virus is thought to activate acid sphingomyelinase as part of cell entry. Functional inhibitors of acid sphingomyelinase or FIASMAs have been shown to have anti-viral and anti-inflammatory properties.
