= Akathisia =

Movement disorder involving a feeling of inner restlessness

- Other names: Acathisia
- Common signs of akathisia
- Pronunciation: /æ.kə.ˈθɪ.si.ə/ a-kə-THI-see-ə
- Specialty: Neurology, psychiatry
- Symptoms: Feelings of restlessness, inability to stay still, uneasy
- Complications: Violence or suicidal thoughts
- Duration: Short- or long-term
- Causes: Antipsychotics, selective serotonin reuptake inhibitors (SSRIs), metoclopramide, reserpine
- Diagnostic method: Based on symptoms
- Differential diagnosis: Anxiety, tic disorders, tardive dyskinesia, dystonia, medication-induced parkinsonism, restless leg syndrome
- Treatment: Reduce or switch antipsychotics, correct iron deficiency, exercise
- Medication: Diphenhydramine, gabapentin, trazodone, benzodiazepines, benztropine, mirtazapine, beta blockers
- Frequency: Relatively common

Akathisia is a movement disorder characterized by a subjective feeling of inner restlessness accompanied by mental distress or an inability to sit still. Usually, the legs are most prominently affected. Those affected may fidget, rock back and forth, or pace, while some may just have an uneasy feeling in their bodies. It may result in poor adherence to psychotropic medications due to the severity of the condition. Aggression, threatening behaviour, violence, and/or suicidal thoughts are also common. The attempts to find potential links between akathisia and emerging suicidal or homicidal behaviour were not systematic and were mostly based on a limited number of case reports and small case series. Apart from these few and low-quality studies, there is another more recent study (a systematic review from 2021) that concludes akathisia cannot be reliably linked to the presence of suicidal behavior in patients treated with antipsychotic medication, however this is not to be mistaken for the actual situation necessarily, considering that a lack of ability to find a connection does not mean a lack of such connection, especially in such a mysterious condition with so little information as akathisia.

Antipsychotic medication, particularly the first-generation antipsychotics, are a leading cause. Other agents commonly responsible for this side-effect may also include selective serotonin reuptake inhibitors, metoclopramide, and reserpine, though any medication listing agitation as a side effect may trigger it. It may also occur upon stopping antipsychotics. The underlying mechanism is believed to involve dopamine. When antidepressants are the cause, there is no agreement on the distinction between activation syndrome and akathisia. Akathisia is often included as a component of activation syndrome. However, the two phenomena are not the same since the former, namely antipsychotic-induced akathisia, suggests a known neuroreceptor mechanism (e.g., dopamine-receptor blockade). Diagnosis is based on the symptoms. It differs from restless leg syndrome in that akathisia is not associated with sleeping. However, despite a lack of historical association between restless leg syndrome and akathisia, this does not guarantee that the two conditions do not share symptoms in individual cases.

If akathisia is caused by an antipsychotic, treatment may include switching to an antipsychotic with a lower risk of the condition. Mirtazapine, although paradoxically associated with the development of akathisia in some individuals, has demonstrated benefit, as have diphenhydramine, trazodone, benzatropine, cyproheptadine, and beta blockers, particularly propranolol.

The term was first used by Czech neuropsychiatrist Ladislav Haškovec, who described the phenomenon in 1901 long before the discovery of antipsychotics, with drug-induced akathisia first being described in 1960. The term akathisia is from Ancient Greek α- (a-), meaning 'not', and καθίζειν (kathízein), meaning 'to sit', or in other words an 'inability to sit'.

== Classification ==
Akathisia is usually classified as a medication-induced movement disorder. It can also be considered a neuropsychiatric concern, however, as it can be experienced purely subjectively without apparent movement abnormalities. Akathisia is generally associated with antipsychotics, but was previously described in Parkinson's disease and other neuropsychiatric disorders. It can also present with the use of non-psychiatric medications, including calcium channel blockers, antibiotics, anti-nausea and anti-vertigo drugs.

== Signs and symptoms ==
Symptoms of akathisia are often described in vague terms, such as feeling nervous, uneasy, tense, twitchy, restless, and unable to relax. Reported symptoms also include insomnia, a sense of discomfort, motor restlessness, dysphoria, marked anxiety, and panic. Symptoms have also been said to resemble symptoms of neuropathic pain similar to fibromyalgia and restless legs syndrome. When caused by psychiatric drugs, akathisia usually disappears quickly once the medication is reduced or stopped. However, late-onset akathisia, or tardive akathisia, may persist for months or years after the medication is discontinued.

When misdiagnosis occurs in antipsychotic-induced akathisia, more antipsychotics may be prescribed, potentially worsening the symptoms. If not identified, akathisia symptoms can increase in severity and lead to suicidal thoughts, aggression and violence.

Visible signs of akathisia include repetitive movements, such as crossing and uncrossing the legs and constant shifting from one foot to the other. Other noted signs include rocking back and forth, fidgeting, and pacing. However, not all observable restless motion is akathisia. For example, while mania, agitated depression, and attention deficit hyperactivity disorder may present like akathisia, movements resulting from them feel voluntary, rather than being due to restlessness.

Jack Henry Abbott, who was diagnosed with akathisia, described the sensation in 1981 as: "You ache with restlessness, so you feel you have to walk, to pace. And then as soon as you start pacing, the opposite occurs to you; you must sit and rest. Back and forth, up and down you go ... you cannot get relief ..."

== Causes ==
=== Medication-induced ===
Medication related causes of akathisia
Category	Examples
Antipsychotics	Haloperidol, levomepromazine, amisulpride, asenapine, risperidone, aripiprazole, lurasidone, ziprasidone
SSRIs	Fluoxetine, paroxetine, citalopram, sertraline
Antidepressants	Venlafaxine, tricyclics, trazodone, mirtazapine, and brexpiprazole
Antiemetics	Metoclopramide, prochlorperazine, droperidol
Drug withdrawal	Antipsychotic withdrawal
Serotonin syndrome	Harmful combinations of psychotropic drugs

Medication-induced akathisia is termed acute akathisia and is frequently associated with the use of antipsychotics. Antipsychotics block dopamine receptors, but the pathophysiology is poorly understood. Even so, drugs with successful therapeutic effects in the treatment of medication-induced akathisia have provided additional insight into the involvement of other transmitter systems. These include benzodiazepines, β-adrenergic blockers, and serotonin antagonists. Another major cause of the syndrome is the withdrawal observed in drug-dependent individuals.

Akathisia involves increased levels of the neurotransmitter norepinephrine, which is associated with mechanisms that regulate aggression, alertness, and arousal. It has been correlated with Parkinson's disease and related syndromes, with descriptions of akathisia predating the existence of pharmacologic agents.

Akathisia can be miscoded in side effect reports from antidepressant clinical trials as "agitation, emotional lability, and hyperkinesis (overactivity)"; misdiagnosis of akathisia as simple motor restlessness occurred, but was more properly classed as dyskinesia.

== Diagnosis ==
The presence and severity of akathisia can be measured using the Barnes Akathisia Scale, which assesses both objective and subjective criteria. Precise assessment of akathisia is problematic, as there are various types making it difficult to differentiate from disorders with similar symptoms.

The primary distinguishing features of akathisia in comparison with other syndromes are primarily subjective characteristics, such as the feeling of inner restlessness and tension. Akathisia can commonly be mistaken for agitation secondary to psychotic symptoms or mood disorder, antipsychotic dysphoria, restless legs syndrome, anxiety, insomnia, drug withdrawal states, tardive dyskinesia, or other neurological and medical conditions.

The controversial diagnosis of "pseudoakathisia" is sometimes given.

== Treatment ==
Acute akathisia induced by medication, often antipsychotics, is treated by reducing or discontinuing the medication. Low doses of the antidepressant mirtazapine may be of help. Biperiden, an anticholinergic, commonly used to improve acute extrapyramidal side effects related to antipsychotic drug therapy, is also used to treat akathisia. Benzodiazepines, such as lorazepam; beta blockers such as propranolol; anticholinergics such as benztropine; and serotonin antagonists such as cyproheptadine may also be of help in treating acute akathisia but are much less effective for treating chronic akathisia. Vitamin B, and iron supplementation if deficient, may be of help. Although they are sometimes used to treat akathisia, benzodiazepines and antidepressants can actually cause akathisia.

== Epidemiology ==
Approximately one out of four individuals treated with first-generation antipsychotics develop akathisia. Prevalence rates may be lower for modern treatment as second-generation antipsychotics carry a lower risk of akathisia. In 2015, a French study found an overall prevalence rate of 18.5% in a sample of outpatients with schizophrenia.

== History ==
The term was first used by Czech neuropsychiatrist Ladislav Haškovec, who described the phenomenon in a non-medication induced presentation in 1901.

Reports of medication-induced akathisia from chlorpromazine appeared in 1954. (Note: "In 1954, two separate researchers, Professor Hans Steck of Lausanne, and German psychiatrist Hans Joachim Haase provided the first unambiguous descriptions of a syndrome of abnormally reduced and restricted movement that was associated with chlorpromazine. [...] They also described the drug-induced agitation known as akathisia (Hasse, 1954; Steck, 1954).") Later in 1960 there were reports of akathisia in response to phenothiazines (a related drug). Akathisia is classified as an extrapyramidal side effect along with other movement disorders that can be caused by antipsychotics.

In the former Soviet Union, akathisia-inducing drugs were allegedly used as a form of torture. Haloperidol, an antipsychotic medication, was used to induce intense restlessness and Parkinson's-type symptoms in prisoners.

In 2020 clinical psychologist and professor of psychology Jordan Peterson was diagnosed with akathisia after being treated for insomnia and depression with benzodiazepines that was associated with an autoimmune disorder and was subsequently treated in Russia.
