= Thioproperazine =

Typical antipsychotic medication

Clinical data
- Trade names: Majeptil
- ATC code: N05AB08 (WHO)

Legal status
- Legal status: BR: Class C1 (Other controlled substances)

Identifiers
- IUPAC name: N,N-dimethyl-10-[3-(4-methylpiperazin-1-yl)propyl]-10H-phenothiazine-2-carboxamide
- CAS Number: 316-81-4
- PubChem CID: 9429
- DrugBank: DB01622
- ChemSpider: 9058
- UNII: YJ050AQ56X
- KEGG: D08585
- ChEBI: CHEBI:59120
- ChEMBL: ChEMBL609109
- CompTox Dashboard (EPA): DTXSID1023655
- ECHA InfoCard: 100.005.695

Chemical and physical data
- Formula: C_{22}H_{30}N_{4}O_{2}S_{2}
- Molar mass: 446.63 g·mol^{−1}
- 3D model (JSmol): Interactive image
- SMILES: CN1CCN(CC1)CCCN2C3=CC=CC=C3SC4=C2C=C(C=C4)S(=O)(=O)N(C)C
- InChI: InChI=1S/C22H30N4O2S2/c1-23(2)30(27,28)18-9-10-22-20(17-18)26(19-7-4-5-8-21(19)29-22)12-6-11-25-15-13-24(3)14-16-25/h4-5,7-10,17H,6,11-16H2,1-3H3; Key:VZYCZNZBPPHOFY-UHFFFAOYSA-N

Thioproperazine, sold under the brand name Majeptil, is a typical antipsychotic of the phenothiazine group which is used as a tranquilizer, antiemetic, sedative, and in the treatment of schizophrenia and manic phase of bipolar disorder. Majeptil is available in 10 mg tablets.

== Side effects ==
Common

- Extrapyramidal symptoms
- Amenorrhea
- Decreased sexual interest and/or function
- Swelling of breasts and milk production in males and females
- Difficulty sleeping
- Constipation
- Reduced amount of urine
- Dizziness
- Drowsiness
- Dry mouth
- Nausea
- Headache
- Weight changes

Rare but potentially serious adverse effects

- Agranulocytosis
- Neuroleptic Malignant Syndrome (NMS)
- Sudden cardiac death
- Torsades de pointes

Elderly individuals with dementia-related psychosis treated with antipsychotic medication are at an increased risk of death compared to individuals not receiving antipsychotics.

== Drug interactions ==
Medications for allergies (e.g., Benadryl diphenhydramine), certain medications for sleep (e.g., lorazepam, zopiclone), certain medications for pain (e.g., fentanyl), and Antiparkinson medications can increase the sedative effect of thioproperazine and can be potentially dangerous when used together.

== Synthesis ==
Thieme Synthesis: Patents (Ex 3):

Thioether formation between 2-Aminothiophenol (1) and 4-Chloro-N,N-Dimethyl-3-Nitrobenzenesulfonamide [137-47-3] (2) gives 4-(2-aminophenyl)sulfanyl-N,N-dimethyl-3-nitrobenzenesulfonamide [5510-56-5] (3). Sandmeyer reaction with cuprous bromide [7787-70-4] gave 4-[(2-Bromophenyl)-thio]-N,N'-dimethyl-3-nitro-benzenesulfonamide [5510-58-7] (4). Bechamp reduction gave 3-Amino-4-((2-bromophenyl)thio)-N,N-dimethylbenzenesulphonamide [5592-64-3] (5). Goldberg reaction completed the formation of the phenothiazine ring and gave N,N-dimethyl-10H-phenothiazine-2-sulfonamide [1090-78-4] (6). Attachment of the sidechain by sodamide reaction with 1-(3-Chloropropyl)-4-Methylpiperazine [104-16-5] (7) completes the synthesis of Thioproperazine (8), respectively.
