= Zolantidine =

Chemical compound

Clinical data
- ATC code: None

Identifiers
- IUPAC name: N-[3-[3-(piperidin-1-ylmethyl)phenoxy]propyl]-1,3-benzothiazol-2-amine
- CAS Number: 104076-38-2
- PubChem CID: 91769
- ChemSpider: 82866
- UNII: M1108XAY01
- ChEMBL: ChEMBL419296
- CompTox Dashboard (EPA): DTXSID6048460

Chemical and physical data
- Formula: C_{22}H_{27}N_{3}OS
- Molar mass: 381.54 g·mol^{−1}
- 3D model (JSmol): Interactive image
- SMILES: n1c4ccccc4sc1NCCCOc2cc(ccc2)CN3CCCCC3
- InChI: InChI=1S/C22H27N3OS/c1-4-13-25(14-5-1)17-18-8-6-9-19(16-18)26-15-7-12-23-22-24-20-10-2-3-11-21(20)27-22/h2-3,6,8-11,16H,1,4-5,7,12-15,17H2,(H,23,24); Key:KUBONGDXTUOOLM-UHFFFAOYSA-N

Zolantidine is a brain-penetrating selective histamine H_{2} receptor (HRH_{2}) antagonist developed by Smith, Kline & French, with the research code of SK&F 95282. It is a benzothiazole derivative with a 30-fold higher potency for H_{2} receptors than other peripheral and central receptors.
