= Artur Brožek =

Brožek in 1927

Artur Brožek (30 March 1882 – 8 November 1934) was a Czech geneticist who pioneered the use of biometrics and statistical approaches to study plant genetics. He was also involved in establishing the field of positive eugenics and rejected Nazi ideas on race. He published a textbook on genetics.

== Life ==
Brožek was born in Třeboň, the son of a tax official. After the early death of his father, he was cared for by his maternal grandfather Kašpar Loula who inculcated an interest in music and nature. He went to grammar school in Třeboň and then in Prague. He studied natural sciences at the University of Prague and received a doctorate in 1907. He taught at high schools in Prague, Roudnice and Čáslav and in 1911 began to work on mathematical biology. In collaboration with Bohumil Němec he studied plant genetics using Mimulus. In 1920, he habilitated in genetics from the Institute for Plant Physiology. He collaborated with American researchers and visited Thomas Hunt Morgan in 1924–25. He returned to the University of Prague where became an associate professor in 1927 and full professor in 1934. He wrote about positive eugenics for human applications in his 1922 book "Zušlechtění lidstva". He studied genealogies of "talented" families. He rejected Nazi ide as on race that were in circulation in the same period. He was a founding member of the Czechoslovak Eugenics Society, and a member of many other organizations including the Czech Entomologist Association and the American Genetic Association.
