= Lysobisphosphatidic acid =

Lysobisphosphatidic acid (LBPA) (also known as bis(monoacylglycero)phosphate (BMP)) is a phospholipid that is found in the membranes of late endosomes and lysosomes of eukaryotic cells.

Phosphatidylglycerol is a precursor and structural isomer of LBPA. LBPA's stereochemistry is atypical among glycerophospholipids and influences its function within the LE/LY (late endosome/lysosome) system.

LBPA makes up 15–20% of all LE/LY phospholipids and is not found in other subcellular membranes. LBPA is primarily found within the inner LE/LY membranes where they play a role in their structure and trafficking processes. In particular, an interaction between NPC2 and LBPA is necessary for intracellular cholesterol trafficking.

== See also ==
- Lysophosphatidic acid
- Niemann-Pick Type C
