= Activation syndrome =

Psychoactive drug-related syndrome

Activation syndrome is a form of stimulation or agitation that has been observed in association with some psychoactive drugs. A causative role has not been established.

Selective serotonin reuptake inhibitors (SSRIs) have been associated with a state of restlessness, lability, agitation, and anxiety termed "activation syndrome". In some people, this state change can increase suicidal tendencies, especially in those under age 25 and during the initial weeks of treatment. SSRI-induced activation syndrome is well-accepted by clinicians. It is unclear whether jitteriness/anxiety syndrome predicts either good or poor prognosis.
