= Sphingomyelin phosphodiesterase =

Class of enzymes

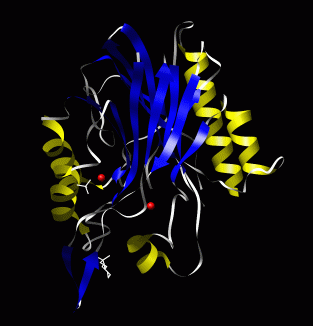
- Crystal structure of sphingomyelinase from Bacillus cereus.

Identifiers
- EC no.: 3.1.4.12
- CAS no.: 9031-54-3

Databases
- IntEnz: IntEnz view
- BRENDA: BRENDA entry
- ExPASy: NiceZyme view
- KEGG: KEGG entry
- MetaCyc: metabolic pathway
- PRIAM: profile
- PDB structures: RCSB PDB PDBe PDBsum
- Gene Ontology: AmiGO / QuickGO
Search
- PMC: articles
- PubMed: articles
- NCBI: proteins

Sphingomyelin phosphodiesterase (EC 3.1.4.12, also known as neutral sphingomyelinase, sphingomyelinase, or SMase; systematic name sphingomyelin cholinephosphohydrolase) is a hydrolase enzyme that is involved in sphingolipid metabolism reactions. SMase is a member of the DNase I superfamily of enzymes and is responsible for breaking sphingomyelin (SM) down into phosphocholine and ceramide. The activation of SMase has been suggested as a major route for the production of ceramide in response to cellular stresses.

== Sphingomyelinase family ==
Five types of SMase have been identified. These are classified according to their cation dependence and pH optima of action and are:

- Lysosomal acid SMase
- Secreted zinc-dependent acid SMase
- Magnesium-dependent neutral SMase
- Magnesium-independent neutral SMase
- Alkaline SMase

Of these, the lysosomal acidic SMase and the magnesium-dependent neutral SMase are considered major candidates for the production of ceramide in the cellular response to stress.

== Neutral sphingomyelinase ==
Neutral sphingomyelinase (N-SMase) activity was first described in fibroblasts from patients with Niemann–Pick disease – a lysosomal storage disease characterized by deficiencies in acid SMase. Subsequent study found that this enzyme was the product of a distinct gene, had an optimum pH of 7.4, was dependent on Mg^{2+} ions for activity, and was particularly enriched in brain. However, a more recent study in bovine brain suggested the existence of multiple N-SMase isoforms with different biochemical and chromatographical properties.

A major breakthrough came in the mid-1980s with the cloning of the first N-SMases from Bacillus cereus and Staphylococcus aureus. Using the sequences of these bacterial sphingomyelinases in homology searches ultimately led to the identification of the yeast N-SMases ISC1 in the budding yeast Saccharomyces cerevisiae and the mammalian N-SMase enzymes, nSMase1 and nSMase2. The identity between mammalian, yeast, and bacterial SMases is very low - being approximately 20% between nSMase2 and the B. cereus SMase. However, an alignment of the sequences (see figure) indicate a number of conserved residues throughout the family, particularly in the catalytic region of the enzymes. This has led to the suggestion of a common catalytic mechanism for the N-SMase family.

A third N-SMase protein – termed nSMase3 – was cloned and characterized in 2006. nSMase3 bears little sequence similarity to either nSMase1 or nSMase2. However, there appears to be a high degree of evolutionary conservation from lower to higher organisms, suggesting that it may comprise a unique and distinct N-SMase. The high expression of nSMase3 in heart and skeletal muscle also suggests potential roles in heart function.

=== Active site ===
Magnified view of SMase active site with Co^{2+} ions bound showing residues responsible for divalent metal cation binding. From PDB: 2dds.

The solving of the crystal structure of the neutral sphingomyelinase from Listeria ivanovii and Bacillus cereus has allowed a fuller understanding of their enzymatic site. The active site of the B. cereus SMase comprises the residues Asn-16, Glu-53, Asp-195, Asn-197, and His-296. Of these, the residues Glu-53, Asp-195, and His-296 are known to be essential for activity. The relative catalytic activities of SMase when metal ions are bound to the active site have been studied for divalent metal ions Co^{2+}, Mn^{2+}, Mg^{2+}, Ca^{2+}, and Sr^{2+}. Of these five metal ions, Co^{2+}, Mn^{2+}, and Mg^{2+} bound to the active site result in high catalytic activity of SMase. Ca^{2+} and Sr^{2+} bound to the active site exhibit much lower catalytic activity of SMase. When one Mg^{2+} ion or two Co^{2+} ions bind to the active site, double hexa-coordinated geometry results with two square bipyramids (octahedra) for Co^{2+} and one octahedron for Mg^{2+}. When one Ca^{2+} ion binds to the active site, a hepta-coordinated geometry results. Therefore, the difference in catalytic activity for metal ions is predicted to be due to geometrical differences. Of Co^{2+} and Mg^{2+}, SMase has better reactivity when two Co^{2+} ions are bound to SMase; when these Co^{2+} ions are bound, Glu-53 and His-296 each bind one divalent metal cation. These cations are surrounded by bridged water molecules and function as Lewis acids.

=== Mechanism ===

The solving of the crystal structure of the neutral sphingomyelinase from Listeria ivanovii and Bacillus cereus has also shed light on their catalytic mechanisms. The active site of SMase contains Glu and His residues that are each bound to one or two divalent metal cations, usually Co^{2+}, Mg^{2+}, or Ca^{2+} for optimum performance. These two cations assist in catalysis by recruiting SM to the active site of SMase. The divalent cation bound to the Glu residue interacts with the amido-oxygen and ester-oxygen between C1 and the phosphate group of SM; an Asn residue and the divalent metal cation bound to the His residue bind to the oxygen atoms of the phosphate group of SM. This stabilizes the phosphate group's negative charge. The metal cation bound to the His residue and Asp and Asn side chains lower the pKa value of one of the bridged water molecules, thus activating a water molecule. This water molecule then acts as a nucleophile and attacks the phosphate group of SM, creating a pentavalent phosphorus atom whose negative charge is stabilized by the divalent metal cations. The phosphate then reforms its tetrahedral conformation and results in the products ceramide and phosphocholine. In 2016 a model based on crystal structure of mammalian acid sphingomyelinase study was proposed whereby ASMase exists in equilibrium between open and closed forms of the saposin domain. In the absence of membranes, closed ASMasesap decoupled from ASMasecat would predominate and render the enzyme inactive. In the presence of anionic membranes, open ASMasesap becomes prevalent, docks onto the membrane surface, and concomitantly forms an interface with the catalytic domain activating it for sphingomyelin hydrolysis.

== See also ==
- Sphingomyelin phosphodiesterase 1
- Sphingomyelin phosphodiesterase D
