= NPC =

NPC may refer to:

== Geography and politics ==
- Nilphamari City (NpC), Rangpur, Bangladesh

== Science and medicine ==
=== Chemistry ===
- NpC, a formula for Neptunium monocarbide

=== Computing ===
- Network Parameter Control, in computer networks
- Non-deterministic polynomial-time complete
- Non-printing character

=== Electronics ===
- Neutral Point Clamped, an inverter topology

=== Medicine ===
- Nasopharyngeal carcinoma
- "Near point of convergence" or "no previous correction", optometric abbreviations
- Neural progenitor cell; see Notch signaling pathway
- Niemann–Pick disease, type C
  - NPC1, a protein involved in the disease
  - NPC2, a protein involved in the disease
- Nuclear pore complex, in molecular biology

== Organizations ==
=== Corporations ===
- National Petrochemical Company, Iran
- National Power Corporation, the Philippines
- Nauru Phosphate Corporation, Republic of Nauru
- Nevada Power Company, United States

=== Political organizations ===
- An abbreviation of Nationalist Party of China, an alias for the Kuomintang
- Nationalist Party of Canada
- National Peace Council (Ghana)
- National Peace Council (United Kingdom)
- Nationalist People's Coalition, a center-right political party in the Philippines
- National People's Congress, China
- National Political Committee, a governing body of the Democratic Socialists of America
- National Petroleum Council (US)
- Northern People's Congress, a political party in Nigeria

=== Student organizations ===
- National Panhellenic Conference, of North American sororities
- National Postgraduate Committee, United Kingdom

=== Other organizations ===
See also under Sports, below

- National Press Club, several press clubs
- National Privacy Commission, Philippines
- Niagara Parks Commission, Ontario, Canada
- Northern Provincial Council, Sri Lanka

== Sports and games ==
=== Sports ===
- National Paralympic Committee, a national constituent of the Paralympic Movement
- National Physique Committee, an American bodybuilding organization
- National Pickleball Center, or Naples Pickleball Center, the home of the U.S. Open Pickleball Championships
- National Provincial Championship (1976–2005), a New Zealand rugby competition
  - National Provincial Championship (2006–present), a New Zealand rugby competition
- Non-playing captain of a team in contract bridge

=== Role-playing and video games ===
- Non-player character, a fictional character in a role-playing or video game that cannot be played or controlled by a real-world person
  - NPC (meme), a political Internet meme

== Research and educational facilities ==
- National Park College, Hot Springs, Arkansas, United States
- Netherlands Proteomics Centre, Netherlands

== Other uses ==
- National Ploughing Championships, Ireland, an agricultural show
- NATO Programming Centre, for air system support
- Neighbourhood police centre, a type of police station in Singapore
- NPC (cable system), linking Japan and the United States
- Fujicolor NPC 160, later Fujicolor Pro 160C, a photographic film
- Nickel plated copper, plating applied to wire products for stability at temperature extremes
