= Albert Niemann =

Albert Niemann may refer to:

- Albert Niemann (tenor) (1831–1917), German opera singer
- Albert Niemann (paediatrician) (1880–1921), his son, described Niemann-Pick disease with Ludwig Pick
- Albert Niemann (chemist) (1834–1861), first isolated the alkaloid cocaine from the plant material
