= Early-onset dementia =

Cognitive disorder

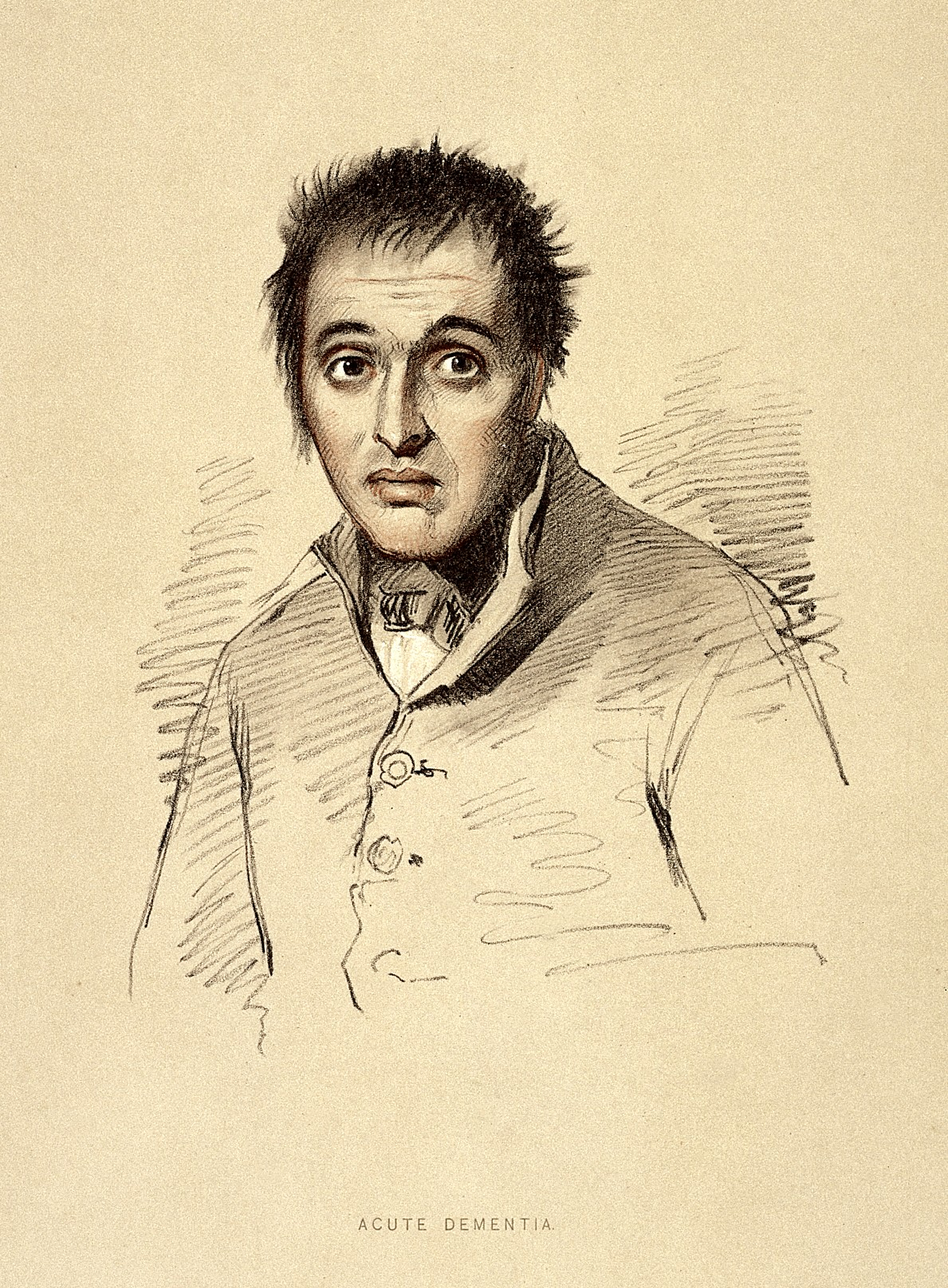
Lithograph of man diagnosed with acute dementia

Early-onset dementia or young-onset dementia refers to dementia with symptom onset prior to age 65 years. Early-onset dementia is a general term that describes a group of conditions featuring progressive cognitive decline, particularly in the domains of executive function, learning, language, memory, or behavior.

This condition may be due to various different causes, including degenerative, autoimmune, or infectious processes. The most common form of early-onset dementia is Alzheimer's disease, followed by frontotemporal dementia, and vascular dementia, with Alzheimer's disease accounting for between 40 and 50% of cases. Less common forms of early-onset dementia include Lewy body dementias (dementia with Lewy bodies and Parkinson's disease dementia), Huntington's disease, Creutzfeldt–Jakob disease, multiple sclerosis, alcohol-induced dementia, and other conditions. Childhood neurodegenerative disorders like mitochondrial diseases, lysosomal storage disorders, and leukodystrophies can also present as early-onset dementia.

Early-onset dementia is a significant public health concern, as the number of individuals with early-onset dementia is increasing worldwide.

== Classification ==
The term dementia refers to a syndrome with main components of memory loss and cognitive impairment, affecting the individual's ability to cope with daily activities, whereas Alzheimer's disease is the most common cause of dementia.

There are a variety of terminologies used to describe early-onset dementia. Terms such as young-onset dementia are being created to help differentiate between dementia occurring in patients younger than 65 (early onset) and more specifically those younger than 45 (young onset). In regard to the classification of this type of dementia, it can be split up into two types: presenile dementia and senile dementia with early onset. Presenile dementia is often used for dementia caused by frontotemporal lobar degeneration, progressive supranuclear palsy, and corticobasal degeneration, the majority of which are below 65 years of age (presenile). Senile dementias can include those caused by Alzheimer's disease and vascular dementia of which the majority (i.e. those that are not of early onset) occur in patients over 65 (senile). However, it is important to acknowledge that Alzheimer's disease is so much more common than the other causes of dementia that it remains the most common cause of dementia in patients both above and between the ages of 50 and 65.

== Signs and symptoms ==
Compared to late-onset dementia, people with early-onset dementia are more likely to have dementias other than Alzheimer's disease, although Alzheimer's is the most common etiology in either case. In general, early-onset dementia has a faster progression and features more extensive neurological damage when compared to late-onset dementia. The initial signs and symptoms are often behavioral changes, depression, or psychosis before progressing onto demonstrable cognitive deficits. It is hypothesized that this may be due to decreased cognitive reserve seen in late-onset dementias, causing more significant complications relative to pathological damage. Furthermore, studies have shown differences in the areas of cognition that are likely to be affected when comparing early-onset to late-onset dementia. In terms of behavioral symptoms, early-onset dementia is more likely to affect attention, but less likely to cause confusion, delusions, hallucinations, agitation, or disinhibition. In terms of motor symptoms, early-onset dementia is less likely to affect verbal fluency and motor executive function than is late-onset dementia.

=== Alzheimer's Disease ===
Alzheimer's disease typically presents with memory decline and can also include both psychiatric and motor symptoms. These psychiatric and motor symptoms may in fact be more common in the early-onset form of the disease.

=== Vascular Dementia ===
Vascular dementia typically presents as stable cognitive deficits whose symptoms appear in steady intervals. The disease can be linked to hypertension, hyperlipidemia, diabetes, tobacco smoking as well as diseases such as cerebral autosomal dominant arteriopathy with subcortical infarcts and leukoencephalopathy (CADASIL) (which has the disease specific symptom of migraine with aura and mood disturbance) and cerebral amyloid angiopathy (CAA) (which has the disease-specific disorder of headache with focal neurological deficits).

=== Frontotemporal Dementia ===
Typically presents with behavioral changes that could be accompanied with motor features.

=== Alpha-synuclein-related pathology (e.g. Lewy Body Dementia and Multiple System Atrophy) ===
These pathologies can present with a range of symptoms. Lewy body dementia typically presents with visual hallucinations and parkinsonism. MSA typically presents with parkinsonism, REM sleep disorder, ataxia, and issues with the autonomic system.

=== Mitochondrial Disorders ===
Includes disorders such as MELAS (mitochondrial encephalopathy with lactic acidosis and stroke-like features) and MERRF (myoclonic epilepsy with ragged red fibers), late-onset childhood neurodegenerative disorders. Typically present with poor growth, weakness, issues with the eyes and ears as well as involvement of multiple organs. The organs that are involved can vary with each person because which organs have the greatest burden of broken mitochondrial DNA change from person to person.

=== Lysosomal disorders ===
Includes Tay-Sachs, Gaucher's, Nieman Pick, and Fabry, late-onset childhood neurodegenerative disorders. Typically present as developmental delay, deafness, blindness, liver, heart, and lung problems as well as neurological dysfunction.

== Causes ==
Early-onset dementia can arise from various causes. The primary contributors include the following:

1. Alzheimer's Disease
2. Vascular Dementia
3. Frontotemporal Dementia

Early-onset dementia can also arise from late-onset childhood neurodegenerative disorders (such as mitochondrial or lysosomal storage disorders) which are the most common causes in patients that are younger than 35. There can also be reversible etiologies such as inflammatory issues (like MS and neurosarcoidosis), infectious diseases, and toxins among others.

=== Risk factors ===
Traditional risk factors for the development of late-onset dementia, such as diabetes mellitus, hypertension, and obesity, have also been identified as risk factors for early-onset dementia. Several other chronic conditions have recently been identified that are also associated with the development of early-onset dementia, including cardiovascular, respiratory, or gastrointestinal disease. The presence of one or multiple of these chronic conditions is more predictive of early-onset dementia than of late-onset dementia. Furthermore, the association between low socioeconomic status and the development of dementia is also more pronounced in early-onset dementia than late-onset dementia. Additionally, depending on the etiology of early-onset dementia, family history may be a significant risk factor, especially for Alzheimer's early-onset dementia. It is more common for women to be diagnosed with Alzheimer's disease compared to men, for men it is more common to contract vascular dementia.

== Diagnosis ==
Though widely accepted, the definition of early-onset dementia as less than 65 years of age continues to be an artificial cut-off based on the traditional retirement age in most countries. Nevertheless, the purpose of having a specific age cut-off is evidenced in the significant differences in the etiology and prognosis of dementia depending on the age category of the patient. Furthermore, the diagnosis of early-onset dementia continues to be challenging because of the wide range of symptoms at presentation and the lower likelihood of considering neurodegenerative causes in this population. Early-onset dementia is far more likely to have prominent psychiatric manifestations and changes in personality and behavior are often misdiagnosed as mood disorders like depression. Recent studies indicate an average of 4.4 years time to diagnosis for early-onset dementia, compared to 2.8 years for late-onset dementia. Indications for the work-up of early-onset dementia in this patient population include progressive, unexplained neurological symptoms; new-onset behavioral changes inconsistent with previous personality, especially in patients without significant psychiatric history; or cognitive changes in patients with a significant family history of early-onset dementia. The diagnostic work-up of early-onset dementia includes combinations of detailed history taking, neuroimaging, behavioral testing, and genetic testing.

The clinical assessment of early-onset dementia begins with obtaining a thorough clinical history focusing on cognitive symptoms (including the time of onset of symptoms and their progression), behavioral changes, psychiatric history, past medical history (including things like head injuries), social history (including alcohol and drug use), and family history. If the patient is unable to recall when their symptoms began or how they progressed it is crucial to obtain a history from their friends and family to help fill in the gaps. It is also important to get a neurological exam and a cognitive assessment with tools such as the MMSE (Mini Mental State Exam) or the MOCA (Montreal Cognitive Assessment).

Laboratory tests can also be useful in establishing a diagnosis. There are a variety of tests that can be used. Blood tests for toxic/ metabolic abnormalities, infectious diseases like HIV, and autoimmune disorders can be crucial to narrowing down the etiology of the diagnosis. Imaging studies such as MRI and CT scans to study patterns of atrophy and signal changes can be useful to help narrow down the diagnosis. CSF studies can be used to help rule in or out infectious or inflammatory etiologies. Neurophysiology studies can be useful if there are associated seizures, myopathies, or neuropathies. Tissue biopsies can also help with a variety of differential diagnoses. Genetic testing can help determine the diagnosis and predict susceptibility but can be prohibitively expensive. When performing these tests it is most beneficial to start with the least invasive and progress to the more invasive studies to help prevent unneeded distress or procedures on the patient.

== Management ==
Treating the reversible causes and enhancing the lives of patients and their caregivers are the main objectives of dementia management. The safety of the patient must be assessed first as people with early-onset dementia can have compromised decision making capabilities. This may include measures such as environmental changes to evaluating ability to drive.

If the underlying cause of dementia is reversible, then the appropriate treatment is carried out. Inflammatory diseases are managed using immunosuppressive therapies, while infectious diseases are treated with antivirals or antibiotics. In cases of toxin-related conditions, the approach focuses on removing the source of exposure and administering appropriate antidotes. Metabolic imbalances and endocrine disorders are addressed by correcting electrolyte disturbances and hormone levels, whereas nutritional deficiencies are managed through targeted supplementation to restore essential nutrients. However, these are uncommon causes of dementia and the chances of reversing dementia are very low.

As of date, there is no cure to stop the progression of dementia. Therefore, the primary aim of treatment is symptom relief using pharmacological and non-pharmacological interventions.

Pharmacological treatment includes acetylcholinesterase inhibitors and N-methyl-D-aspartate antagonists. These drugs are used for dementia caused by Alzheimer's disease although they only manage the symptoms and do not help with disease progression. Cholinesterase inhibitors (donepezil, rivastigmine, galantamine) are used in mild to moderate dementia while NMDA is used in moderate to severe dementia.

Nonpharmacological treatments are very important in cases of early-onset dementia. People dealing with the disease have a much greater chance of being subjected to marginalization, shaming, and blaming which are harmful to the life of the patient as well as the management process. These interventions can range from providing access to home care in the later stages of the disease to joining support groups to acknowledging the burden experienced by the caregiver. Special considerations for interdisciplinary support should be pursued for younger patients, such as behavioral counseling, social services, or home modifications. The World Health Organization promotes the importance of rehabilitation services (including cognitive, psychological, physical and social support) to improve the quality of life of those with dementia. Despite this, specific services for those with early-onset dementia are rare. The integration of age-appropriate services into existing dementia care, and the use of telehealth have both been explored as options for reducing cognitive disability and improving quality of life in early-onset dementia.

=== Mental health and early-onset dementia ===
Mental health problems such as depression, anxiety, and changes in behaviour are common in people with young‑onset dementia (YOD). These symptoms may appear before a dementia diagnosis is made, which can sometimes lead to delays in recognition or to people being referred first to mental health services. Younger people with dementia may also experience additional emotional difficulties related to the impact on employment, family roles, and identity.

People with YOD are over‑represented among admissions to mental health wards compared with older adults with dementia. This is in part because younger people often have more pronounced behavioural and personality changes, which community services struggle to manage because dementia services are designed around older adults’ needs.

Specialist mental health wards designed specifically for people with young‑onset dementia are rare.As a result, younger people may be admitted either to general adult psychiatric wards—alongside people with a wide range of mental health conditions—or to older adult dementia wards, where the environment and activities may not be well suited to their needs. There is currently no clear evidence on the best model of inpatient mental health care for people with YOD, and service provision varies widely between regions.

== Disease course ==
=== Prognosis ===
Estimating survival rates in early-onset dementia is crucial for prognosis, management, and treatment. Generally, a better prognosis is positively correlated with an earlier age of onset. Average survival time is approximately 6–10 years following diagnosis for both men and women, with variability depending on a specific type of dementia. The most common cause of immediate death in patients with early-onset dementia is respiratory disease (e.g. pneumonia); other contributing factors are cardiovascular events and cerebrovascular disease.

== Epidemiology ==
Early-onset dementia is less common than late-onset dementia, the former accounting for approximately 10% of dementias globally. Recent studies estimate the prevalence of early-onset dementia to be approximately 3.55 million people aged 30–64 worldwide, and will triple by 2050. with an incidence of 119 per 100,000 individuals. Additionally, there is approximately a 1:1 ratio in prevalence of early-onset dementia between males and females, with no significant difference between ethnic groups in gender distribution pattern. As with late-onset dementia, the prevalence of early-onset dementia increases exponentially with age, doubling every five years of age. The continuous increase in prevalence with age seen in Alzheimer's and frontotemporal dementia versions of early-onset dementia is disproportionally led by the most common variant of each cause, namely amnestic Alzheimer's and behavioral variant of frontotemporal dementia.

== Research ==
Recent research has focused on the different age groups of dementia and how they differ from one another. Studies have found there is a greater diversity among younger people who have dementia compared to older patients. Evidence have been found on Alzheimer's disease causes in the brains of young people which can result in phenotypic variants compared to older people. This explains why younger people with Alzheimer's disease have more awareness than older individuals.

== See also ==
- Childhood dementia
- Early-onset Alzheimer's disease
