= PTCHD4 =

Protein

Identifiers
- Aliases: PTCHD4, C6orf138, dJ402H5.2, PTCH53, patched domain containing 4
- External IDs: OMIM: 616908; MGI: 1920485; GeneCards: PTCHD4

Gene location (Human)
Chr.	Chromosome 6 (human)
Band	6p12.3	Start	47,856,673 bp
Band	6p12.3	End	48,111,197 bp

Gene location (Mouse)
Chr.	Chromosome 17 (mouse)
Band	17|17 B3	Start	42,626,838 bp
Band	17|17 B3	End	42,815,968 bp
RNA expression pattern
Bgee	Human / Mouse (ortholog); Top expressed in: stromal cell of endometrium; islet of Langerhans; Achilles tendon; apex of heart; ascending aorta; smooth muscle tissue; anterior pituitary; Descending thoracic aorta; canal of the cervix; prefrontal cortex / Top expressed in: lumbar subsegment of spinal cord; substantia nigra; lobe of cerebellum; embryo; facial motor nucleus; cerebellar vermis; piriform cortex; anterior horn of spinal cord; superior colliculus; embryo; More reference expression data
BioGPS	n/a
Gene ontology
Molecular function	molecular function
Cellular component	membrane; integral component of membrane; cellular component
Biological process	biological process
Sources:Amigo / QuickGO
Orthologs
Databases	NCBI: entry; OMA: entry
Species	Human	Mouse
Entrez	442213	627626
Ensembl	ENSG00000244694	ENSMUSG00000042256
UniProt	Q6ZW05	B9EKX1
RefSeq (mRNA)	NM_001013732; NM_207499; NM_001384253	NM_028474; NM_001355270
RefSeq (protein)	NP_001013754; NP_997382	NP_082750; NP_001342199
Location (UCSC)	Chr 6: 47.86 – 48.11 Mb	Chr 17: 42.63 – 42.82 Mb
PubMed search
- Wikidata
View/Edit Human	View/Edit Mouse

Patched Domain-Containing Protein 4 (PTCHD4) is a protein, which in humans is encoded by the Patched Domain-Containing Protein 4 gene. It is otherwise known by the aliases: PTCHD4, C6orf138, dj402H5.2, and by the accession number BC137364.

== Homology ==
=== Orthologs ===
Sequenced distant orthologs of human PTCHD4 have been found as far back in evolution as mold, which shows a conservation of 16% identity. Strict orthologs include boneless fish, but not echinoderms, insects, or plants.

=== Paralogs ===
PTCHD4 has three other genes in its family: PTCHD1, PTCHD2, and PTCHD3, as well as the Niemann-Pick disease type C protein. These paralogs are far less conserved than strict orthologs, which may suggest that they split long before speciation.

== Gene ==
Human PTCHD4 is located on the negative strand of chromosome 6, at 6p12.3. From there, it covers 190,350 base pairs, which includes three exons and two introns.

=== Expression ===
Nominal expression of PTCHD4 was found in the brain, connective tissue, embryonic tissue, lungs, placenta, testis, trachea, and uterus, with the greatest expression in the trachea. Nominal expression was also found in the following disease states: chondrosarcoma, germ cell tumors, non-neoplasia, and uterine tumors. Protein localization was found in all tissues examined except the salivary glands, yet RNA expression was scarcely found anywhere. This may suggest that PTCHD4 protein is particularly resilient to degradation, and that it is only produced under key circumstances or at key life stages.

== Protein ==
Homo sapiens PTCHD4 variant 1 is 846 amino acids in length, weighs 96.4 kilodaltons, and has an isoelectric point of 8.8. It has two isomers, which are denoted as variant 2 and variant X1. It is phenylalanine rich, and found in the cell membrane.

=== Structure ===
Phyre2 extrapolated the following 3D secondary structure with 100% certainty after analyzing 745 residues, (an 88% majority) of PTCHD4’s human protein sequence. Results were remarkably similar in such distant orthologs as earthworms, boneless fish, and green algae. There are an estimate 10 transmembrane helices.

=== Predicted function ===
PTCHD4 has been implicated as an integral component of cellular membrane, and as a protein receptor in the hedgehog pathway. The later of these two functions causes an inhibitory effect during the development of embryonic cells in all bilaterians and vertebrates. In mammals, the hedgehog pathway is vital to the proper development of the brain, skeleton, musculature, gastrointestinal tract, and lungs. It also appears to be important to adult animals, as it has been implicated in the regulation of adult stem cells, while its malfunction is associated basal cell carcinoma.
