= Nizubaglustat =

Clinical data
- Other names: AZ-3102

Legal status
- Legal status: investigational

Identifiers
- IUPAC name: (2S,3R,4R,5S)-1-[5-[(3-fluoro-4-phenylphenyl)methoxy]pentyl]-2-(hydroxymethyl)piperidine-3,4,5-triol
- CAS Number: 1633666-49-5
- PubChem CID: 101882900
- IUPHAR/BPS: 13906
- DrugBank: DB21603
- ChemSpider: 58132507
- UNII: 2X6NHN9RRN
- KEGG: D13365
- ChEBI: CHEBI:755338
- ChEMBL: ChEMBL3354637

Chemical and physical data
- Formula: C_{24}H_{32}FNO_{5}
- Molar mass: 433.520 g·mol^{−1}
- 3D model (JSmol): Interactive image
- SMILES: C1[C@@H]([C@H]([C@@H]([C@@H](N1CCCCCOCC2=CC(=C(C=C2)C3=CC=CC=C3)F)CO)O)O)O
- InChI: InChI=InChI=1S/C24H32FNO5/c25-20-13-17(9-10-19(20)18-7-3-1-4-8-18)16-31-12-6-2-5-11-26-14-22(28)24(30)23(29)21(26)15-27/h1,3-4,7-10,13,21-24,27-30H,2,5-6,11-12,14-16H2/t21-,22-,23+,24+/m0/s1; Key:IRIRASPSMMWZOM-CJRSTVEYSA-N

Nizubaglustat is an investigational new drug that is being evaluated by Azafaros BV for the treatment of Niemann–Pick disease type C. It is a dual inhibitor of glucosylceramide synthase (GCS; UGCG) and the non-lysosomal glucocerebrosidase (GBA2). In Niemann-Pick Type C Disease, metabolites such as unesterified cholesterol and glycosphingolipids build up in endosomes and lysosomes. By inhibiting the GCS and GBA2 enzymes, the buildup of these metabolites is reduced. Hence nizubaglustat is classified as a type of substrate reduction therapy.

== Clinical trials ==
Nizubaglustat is in phase 3 clinical trials for Niemann-Pick Type C Disease.
