= SHOC1 =

Protein-coding gene in the species Homo sapiens

Identifiers
- Aliases: SHOC1, chromosome 9 open reading frame 84, ZIP2H, ZIP2, shortage in chiasmata 1, C9orf84, MZIP2
- External IDs: OMIM: 618038; MGI: 2140313; GeneCards: SHOC1

Gene location (Human)
Chr.	Chromosome 9 (human)
Band	9q31.3	Start	111,686,171 bp
Band	9q31.3	End	111,795,008 bp

Gene location (Mouse)
Chr.	Chromosome 4 (mouse)
Band	4|4 B3	Start	59,043,753 bp
Band	4|4 B3	End	59,138,983 bp
RNA expression pattern
Bgee	Human / Mouse (ortholog); Top expressed in: pancreatic ductal cell; sperm; testicle; right testis; left testis; buccal mucosa cell; gonad; right adrenal cortex; human kidney; Achilles tendon / Top expressed in: zygote; secondary oocyte; primary oocyte; spermatocyte; morula; spermatid; blastocyst; embryo; testicle; esophagus; More reference expression data
BioGPS	n/a
Gene ontology
Molecular function	DNA binding; single-stranded DNA binding; hydrolase activity; ATPase activity
Cellular component	condensed nuclear chromosome; chromosome
Biological process	resolution of meiotic recombination intermediates; meiosis
Sources:Amigo / QuickGO
Orthologs
Databases	NCBI: entry; OMA: entry
Species	Human	Mouse
Entrez	158401	100155
Ensembl	ENSG00000165181	ENSMUSG00000038598
UniProt	Q5VXU9	A2ALV5
RefSeq (mRNA)	NM_001080551; NM_173521; NM_001378211; NM_001378212	NM_001033200; NM_001370843
RefSeq (protein)	NP_001074020; NP_775792; NP_001365140; NP_001365141	NP_001357772
Location (UCSC)	Chr 9: 111.69 – 111.8 Mb	Chr 4: 59.04 – 59.14 Mb
PubMed search
- Wikidata
View/Edit Human	View/Edit Mouse

Shortage In Chiasmata 1, also known as SHOC1, is a protein that in humans is encoded by the SHOC1 gene. This protein functions as an ATPase that is involved in chromosome homologous recombination.

== Gene ==
The chromosomal locus of SHOC1 is 9q31.3, which it shares with at least 115 other protein encoding genes, and it is located on the negative strand. In humans it contains 34 exons, and it is 108,834 base pairs long, including introns and exons. C9orf84 is located between the protein encoding genes GNG10 and UGCG. When this gene is transcribed in humans, it most often forms a mRNA which is 4,721 base pairs long and contains 26 exons. There are at least 13 alternate splice forms of C9orf84, with more predicted.

== Protein ==
SHOC1 in humans has at least 6 alternate isoforms, with at least 10 more predicted. The primarily used sequence in humans is C9orf84 Isoform 1. This isoform is 1444 aa long, contains 26 exons, has a predicted molecular weight of 165.190 kDa, and a predicted pI of 5.10.

SHOC1 has been shown to undergo phosphorylation. It is predicted that C9orf84 undergoes several other post-translational modifications, including glycosylation and o-linked glycosylation, and it contains leucine-rich nuclear export signals. Compared to the generic reference set swp23s.q, the primary structure of the protein is deficient in the amino acid grouping AGP (alanine, glycine, proline), and contains more acidic amino acids (glutamate, aspartate) than basic amino acids (lysine, arginine). This is true for the protein in all vertebrates. In the human Isoform 1, there have been 220 identified single nucleotide polymorphisms detected in the coding region, but none have currently been linked to human disease. The secondary structure of this protein is predicted to be mainly alpha-helices in roughly the first two thirds of the protein, and coils in the last third. It is predicted that this protein is localized in the nucleus.

=== Expression ===
SHOC1 is ubiquitously expressed in most tissues with higher than average expression in the testes, the kidney, the thymus, and the adrenal gland.

The promoter for SHOC1 Isoform 1 in humans is 639 bp long and overlaps with the 5' untranslated region of the gene. There are four alternate promoters that promote different transcript variants.

=== Interactions ===
SHOC1 has been experimentally determined, through a two hybrid pooling approach, to interact with methionine aminopeptidase, a protein encoded by the maP3 gene in Bacillus anthracis.

Several of the most common and most conserved transcription factor binding sites families that are predicted to be found in C9orf84's promoter region are ETS1 factors, Ccaat/Enhancer Binding Proteins, and Lymphoid enhancer-binding factor 1. ETS1, Ccaat-enhancer-binding proteins, and Lymphoid enhancer-binding factor 1 are all related to immunity.

== Evolutionary history ==
This gene is found in all vertebrates, and some invertebrates. The most distant ortholog detectable by NCBI BLAST is in Nematostella vectensis (starlet sea anemone). The closest plant ortholog to C9orf84 is the SHOC1 protein in Arabidopsis thaliana. C9orf84 is not very well conserved even among mammals.

== Clinical significance ==
Pathogenic mutations in SHOC1 have been associated with male infertility, which has been designated as spermatogenic failure-75 (SPGF75). This disorder follows an autosomal recessive pattern.
