= Niemann–Pick disease type C =

- Other names: Niemann–Pick disease type D
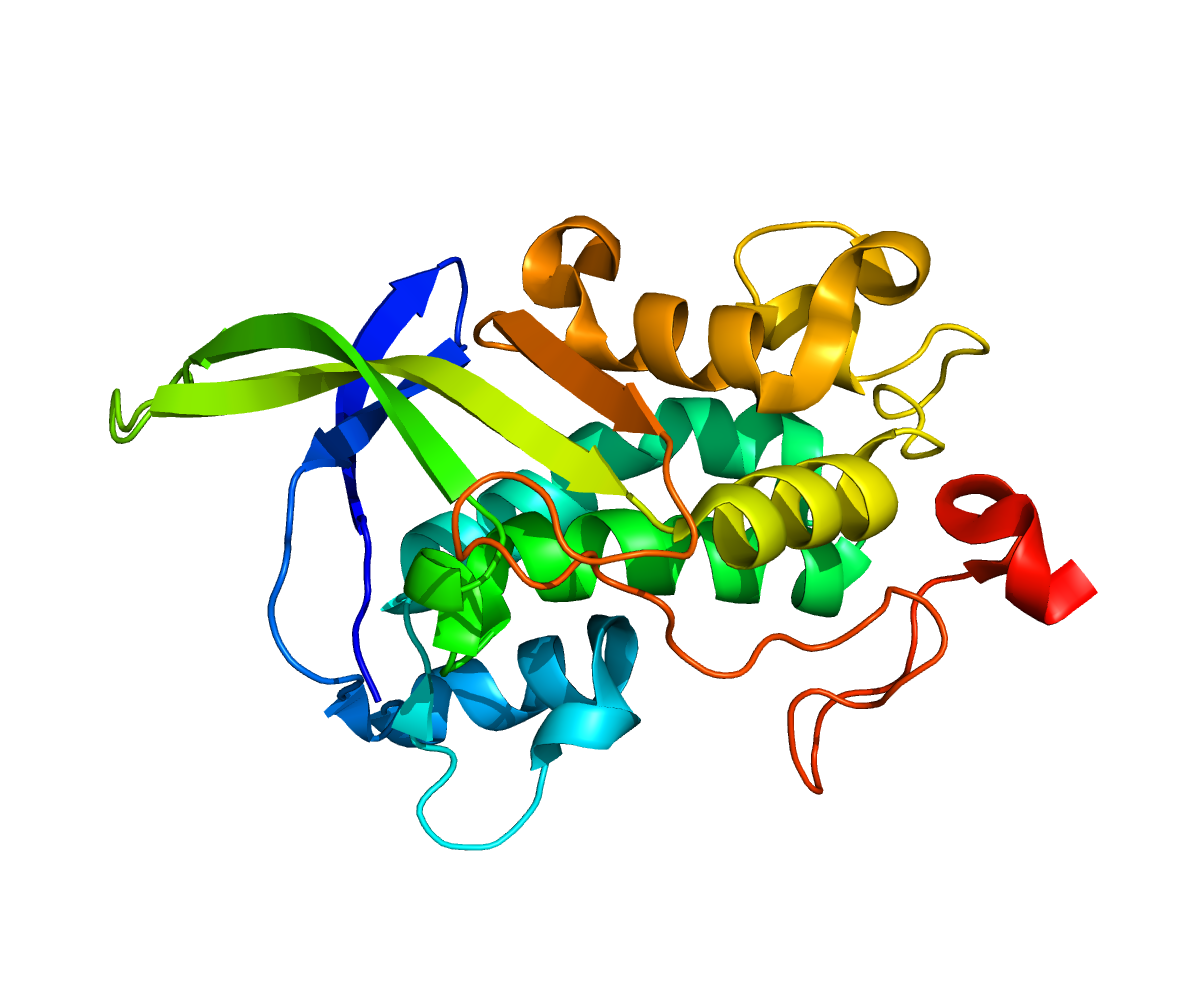
- NPC1, the protein that is mutated in Niemann–Pick disease type C
- Specialty: Endocrinology, neurology
- Symptoms: Hepatosplenomegaly, dementia
- Complications: Akinetic mutism, respiratory arrest
- Usual onset: 50% by the age of 10
- Duration: Longer duration if symptoms begin later in life, most die by the age of 13
- Types: Type C1, type C2, type D (obsolete)
- Causes: Mutations in the NPC1 and NPC2 genes
- Risk factors: Having parents with the disease, or parents that are carriers of the disease
- Diagnostic method: Gene sequencing
- Differential diagnosis: Other childhood dementias
- Prevention: Gene editing
- Treatment: Arimoclomol, levacetylleucine, experimental treatments, and palliative care
- Medication: Arimoclomol and levacetylleucine
- Prognosis: Invariably fatal, duration varies
- Frequency: 1 in 150,000

Niemann–Pick type C (NPC) (colloquially, "Childhood Alzheimer's") is a lysosomal storage disease associated with mutations in NPC1 and NPC2 genes. Niemann–Pick type C affects an estimated 1:150,000 people. Approximately 50% of cases present before ten years of age, but manifestations may first be recognized as late as the sixth decade. Despite its name, Niemann–Pick disease type C has very little to do with SMPD1-associated Niemann–Pick disease, although they were once thought to be the same disease.

== Signs and symptoms ==
Niemann–Pick type C disease has a wide clinical spectrum. Affected individuals may have enlargement of the spleen (splenomegaly) and liver (hepatomegaly), or enlarged spleen or liver combined (hepatosplenomegaly), but this finding may be absent in later onset cases. Prolonged jaundice or elevated bilirubin can present at birth. In some cases, however, enlargement of the spleen or liver does not occur for months or years – or not at all. Enlargement of the spleen or liver frequently becomes less apparent with time, in contrast to the progression of other lysosomal storage diseases such as Niemann–Pick disease, Types A and B or Gaucher disease. Organ enlargement does not usually cause major complications.

Progressive neurological disease is the hallmark of Niemann–Pick type C disease, and is responsible for disability and premature death in all cases beyond early childhood. Classically, children with NPC may initially present with delays in reaching normal developmental milestones skills before manifesting cognitive decline (dementia).

Neurological signs and symptoms include cerebellar ataxia (unsteady walking with uncoordinated limb movements), dysarthria (slurred speech), dysphagia (difficulty in swallowing), tremor, epilepsy (both partial and generalized), vertical supranuclear palsy (upgaze palsy, downgaze palsy, saccadic palsy or paralysis), sleep inversion, gelastic cataplexy (sudden loss of muscle tone or drop attacks), dystonia (abnormal movements or postures caused by contraction of agonist and antagonist muscles across joints), most commonly begins with inturning of one foot when walking (action dystonia) and may spread to become generalized, spasticity (velocity dependent increase in muscle tone), hypotonia, ptosis (drooping of the upper eyelid), microcephaly (abnormally small head), psychosis, progressive dementia, progressive hearing loss, bipolar disorder, major and psychotic depression that can include hallucinations, delusions, mutism, or stupor.

In the terminal stages of Niemann–Pick type C disease, the patient is bedridden, with complete ophthalmoplegia, loss of volitional movement and severe dementia.

== Genetics ==
Approximately 95% of Niemann–Pick type C cases are caused by genetic mutations in the NPC1 gene, referred to as type C1; 5% are caused by mutations in the NPC2 gene, referred to as type C2. The clinical manifestations of types Niemann–Pick types C1 and C2 are similar because the respective genes are both involved in egress of lipids, particularly cholesterol, from late endosomes or lysosomes. The NPC1 gene is located on chromosome 18 (18q11-q12) and was described by researchers at the National Institutes of Health in July 1997.

- The NPC1 gene encodes a protein that is located in membranes inside the cell and is involved in the movement of cholesterol and lipids within cells. A deficiency of this protein leads to the abnormal buildup of lipids and cholesterol within cell membranes.
- The NPC2 gene encodes a protein that binds and transports cholesterol. It has been shown to closely interact with NPC1.

=== "Type D" variant ===
Type D Niemann–Pick has only been found in the French Canadian population of Yarmouth County, Nova Scotia, and is now known to be allelic with Niemann–Pick type C.

Genealogical research indicates that Joseph Muise (c. 1679–1729) and Marie Amirault (1684 – c. 1735) are common ancestors to all people with Type D. This couple is the most likely origin for the type D variant.

== Pathophysiology ==
Niemann–Pick type C is biochemically, genetically and clinically distinct from Niemann–Pick types A or B. In Types A and B, there is complete or partial deficiency of the lysosomal enzyme called acid sphingomyelinase. In Niemann–Pick type C, the protein product of the major mutated gene NPC1 is not an enzyme but appears to function as a transporter in the endosomal-lysosomal system, which moves large water-insoluble molecules through the cell. The protein coded by the NPC2 gene more closely resembles an enzyme structurally but seems to act in cooperation with the NPC1 protein in transporting molecules in the cell. The disruption of this transport system results in the accumulation of cholesterol and glycolipids in lysosomes.

Cholesterol and glycolipids have varied roles in the cell. Cholesterol is a major component of cell plasma membranes, which define the cell as a whole and its organelles. It is also the basic building block of steroid hormones, including neurosteroids. In Niemann–Pick type C, large amounts of free or unesterified cholesterol accumulate in lysosomes, and leads to relative deficiency of this molecule in multiple membranes and for steroid synthesis. The accumulation of glycosphingolipids in the nervous system has been linked to structural changes, namely ectopic dendritogenesis and meganeurite formation, and has been targeted therapeutically.

Several theories have attempted to link the accumulation of cholesterol and glycolipids in the lysosomes with the malfunction of the NPC-1 protein.

- Neufeld et al. hypothesized that the accumulation of mannose 6-phosphate receptors (MPRs) in the late endosome signals failure of retrograde trafficking of cholesterol via the trans Golgi network.
- Another theory suggests that the blockage of retrograde cholesterol breakdown in the late endosome is due to decreased membrane elasticity and thus the return vesicles of cholesterol to the trans Golgi Network cannot bud and form.
- Iouannou, et al. have described similarities between the NPC1 protein and members of the resistance-nodulation-division (RND) family of prokaryotic permeases, suggesting a pumping function for NPC1.
- Recent 2008 evidence indicates that NPC-1 may play an important role in calcium regulation.

== Diagnosis ==
Niemann–Pick type C is diagnosed by assaying cultured fibroblasts for cholesterol esterification and staining for unesterified cholesterol with filipin. The fibroblasts are grown from a small skin biopsy taken from a patient with suspected NPC. The diagnosis can be confirmed by identifying mutations in the NPC1 or NPC2 genes in 80–90% of cases. This specialized testing is available at Thomas Jefferson University Lysosomal Disease Testing Lab and the Mayo Clinic.

== Treatment ==
=== Arimoclomol ===
Arimoclomol, sold under the brand name Miplyffa, is a medication used for the treatment of Niemann–Pick disease type C. It is taken by mouth.

The most common side effects include upper respiratory tract infection, diarrhea, and decreased weight.

Arimoclomol was approved for medical use in the United States in September 2024. The US Food and Drug Administration (FDA) considers it to be a first-in-class medication.

=== Levacetylleucine ===
Levacetylleucine (N-acetyl-L-leucine), sold under the brand name Aqneursa, is a medication used for the treatment of neurological manifestations of Niemann-Pick disease type C and for the treatment of ataxia. Levacetylleucine is a modified version of the amino acid leucine. It is the L-form of acetylleucine. It is taken by mouth.

The most common side effects include abdominal pain, difficulty swallowing, upper respiratory tract infections, and vomiting. The most common side effects in people with ataxia-telangiectasia were fall, skin laceration, and urinary tract infection.

Levacetylleucine was approved for medical use in the United States in September 2024, and in the European Union in January 2026. Levacetylleucine is the second medication approved by the US Food and Drug Administration (FDA) for the treatment of Niemann-Pick disease type C. The FDA considers it to be a first-in-class medication. Levacetylleucine is the first treatment approved for ataxia in people with ataxia-telangiectasia.

=== Hydroxypropyl-beta-cyclodextrin (HPbCD) ===
In April 2009, hydroxypropyl-beta-cyclodextrin (HPbCD) was approved under compassionate use by the U.S. Food and Drug Administration (FDA) to treat Addison and Cassidy Hempel, identical twin girls who had Niemann–Pick type C disease. Medi-ports, similar to ports used to administer chemotherapy drugs, were surgically placed into the twins' chest walls and allow doctors to directly infuse HPbCD into their bloodstreams. Treatment with cyclodextrin has been shown to delay clinical disease onset, reduced intraneuronal storage and secondary markers of neurodegeneration, and significantly increased lifespan in both the Niemann–Pick type C mice and feline models. This is the second time in the United States that cyclodextrin alone has been administered in an attempt to treat a fatal pediatric disease. In 1987, HPbCD was used in a medical case involving a boy with severe hypervitaminosis A.

In May 2010, the FDA granted hydroxypropyl-beta-cyclodextrin orphan drug status and designated HPbCD cyclodextrin as a potential treatment for Niemann–Pick type C disease. In July 2010, Dr. Caroline Hastings of UCSF Benioff Children's Hospital Oakland filed additional applications with the FDA requesting approval to deliver HPbCD directly into the central nervous systems of the twins in an attempt to help HPbCD cross the blood–brain barrier. The request was approved by the FDA in September 2010, and bi-monthly intrathecal injections of HPbCD into the spine were administered starting in October 2010.

In December 2010, the FDA granted approval for HPbCD to be delivered via IV to an additional patient, Peyton Hadley, aged 13, under an IND with Dr. Diane Williams, through Asante Rogue Regional Medical Center in Medford, Oregon. Soon after in March 2011, approval was sought for similar treatment of his sibling, Kayla, age 11, and infusions of HPbCD began shortly after. Both began intrathecal treatments beginning January 2012. In 2014 Peyton had an intrathecal smart port placed by OHSU's neurosurgeon Dr. Lissa Baird, to alleviate sedation during the intrathecal procedures. It was successful and continues to be used for treatment (currently 2023). They continue in 2023 to receive both IV and IT treatments; 8 hour IV from home twice monthly, and IT twice monthly at Asante Rogue Regional Medical Center, rotating with IV and IT every week. These patients have proven safety and benefit shown by NIH Severity Scale Assessments, one slightly less impacted than projected and the other with a profound impact and benefit than projected.

In April 2011, the National Institutes of Health (NIH), in collaboration with the Therapeutics for Rare and Neglected Diseases Program (TRND), announced they were developing a clinical trial utilizing cyclodextrin for Niemann–Pick type C patients.

In September 2011, the European Medicines Agency (EMA) granted HPbCD orphan drug status and designated the compound as a potential treatment for Niemann–Pick type C disease.

In December 2011, the FDA granted approval for IV HPbCD infusions for a fifth child in the United States, Chase DiGiovanni, under a compassionate use protocol. The child was 29 months old at the time of his first intravenous infusion, which was started in January 2012.

Due to unprecedented collaboration between individual physicians and parents of children affected by NPC, approximately 15 patients worldwide have received HPbCD cyclodextrin therapy under compassionate use treatment protocols. Treatment involves a combination of intravenous therapy (IV), intrathecal therapy (IT) and intracerebroventricular (ICV) cyclodextrin therapy.

In January 2013, a formal clinical trial to evaluate HPβCD cyclodextrin therapy as a treatment for Niemann–Pick disease, type C was announced by scientists from the NIH's National Center for Advancing Translational Sciences (NCATS) and the Eunice Kennedy Shriver National Institute of Child Health and Human Development (NICHD).

In January 2021, Mallinckrodt Pharmaceuticals concluded that the benefit / risk balance for HPβCD cyclodextrin (adrabetadex) for the treatment of neurologic symptoms of NPC was negative, and that the risks associated with the treatment outweigh the potential benefit. Effective immediately, Mallinckrodt recommended that treatment with adrabetadex be discontinued as soon as possible, with the appropriate physician oversight.

=== Other treatments under investigation ===
One drug that has been tried is Miglustat. Miglustat is a glucosylceramide synthase inhibitor, which inhibits the synthesis of glycosphingolipids in cells. It has been shown to delay the onset of disease in the NPC mouse, and published data from a multi-center clinical trial of Miglustat in the United States and England and from case reports suggests that it may ameliorate the course of human NPC.

Several other treatment strategies are under investigation in cell culture and animal models of NPC. These include, cholesterol mobilization, neurosteroid (a special type of hormone that affects brain and other nerve cells) replacement using allopregnanolone, rab overexpression to bypass the trafficking block (Pagano lab) and Curcumin as an anti-inflammatory and calcium modulatory agent. The pregnane X receptor has been identified as a potential target.

Neural stem cells have also been investigated in an animal model, and clear evidence of life extension in the mouse model has been shown.

Low cholesterol diets are often used, but there is no evidence of efficacy.

Gene therapy is being used clinically to treat genetic diseases including haemophilia and spinal muscular atrophy. It has been used preclinically, in a mouse model of Niemann–Pick type C, using an adeno-associated virus derived viral vector has been shown to extend lifespan following injection into the lateral ventricles of the neonatal brain. In a separate proof-of-concept study a similar vector, but with a modified capsid capable of delivering genes to the central nervous system following intravenous injection, was given to Niemann–Pick type C mice at around four weeks of age; this resulted in extended lifespan and improved weight gain.

Nizubaglustat is a dual inhibitor of glucosylceramide synthase (GCS; UGCG) and the non-lysosomal glucocerebrosidase (GBA2). It currently in phase 3 clinical trials.

== Prognosis ==
The lifespan of patients with NPC is usually related to the age of onset. Children with antenatal or infantile onset usually succumb in the first few months or years of life, whereas adolescent and adult onset forms of Niemann–Pick type C have a more insidious onset and slower progression, and affected individuals may survive to the seventh decade. Adult cases of NPC are being recognized with increasing frequency. It is suspected that many patients affected by NPC are undiagnosed, owing to lack of awareness of the disease and the absence of readily available screening or diagnostic tests. For the same reasons the diagnosis is often delayed by many years.

== Research directions ==
Loss of myelin in the central nervous system is considered to be a main pathogenic factor. Research uses animal models carrying the underlying mutation for Niemann–Pick disease, e.g. a mutation in the NPC1 gene Niemann–Pick type C disease. In this model the expression of Myelin gene Regulatory Factor (MRF) has been shown to be significantly decreased. MRF is a transcription factor of critical importance in the development and maintenance of myelin sheaths. A perturbation of oligodendrocyte maturation and the myelination process might therefore be an underlying mechanism of the neurological deficits.

Recent neuroimaging studies have shown patients with Niemann–Pick, type C to have a corpus callosum with microstructural abnormalities. Clear reductions in corpus callosum mean thickness and surface area have been shown when compared to age-matched controls. Also, studies using diffusion tensor imaging have shown marked reductions in callosal fractional anisotropy, which suggests architectural abnormalities based on the directional flow of water. These conclusions suggest that the corpus callosum plays an important role in the disease and should be explored for use as a biomarker of disease progression.

Parents of children with NPC are being studied in an attempt to gain insight into the Ebola virus, which uses the protein encoded by NPC1 to enter cells. Researchers have found that mice with one normal copy of the NPC1 gene are more likely to survive Ebola infection than mice with normal two copies of the gene. Mice lacking any normal copy of NPC1 all survived. Studying cells from parents who are NPC disease carriers may allow for better understanding of how changes to the NPC1 gene affect Ebola risk.

Findings from Zhang et al. suggest that NPC is a late endocytic trafficking disease resulted, at least in part, from disruption of communication within late endocytic (LE) compartments and possibly between LE and other subcellular organelles. Crosstalk between the late endocytic compartment and other organelles such as mitochondria, endoplasmic reticulum, plasma membrane, as well as early endocytic compartments has become one of the most interesting frontiers in neurondegenerative disease research including Alzheimer's disease, Parkinson's disease, as well as lysosomal storage disorders.
