= C18H17Cl2NO3 =

The molecular formula C_{18}H_{17}Cl_{2}NO_{3} may refer to:

- A-971432
- Benzoylprop
