= Hedwig Raabe =

German actress

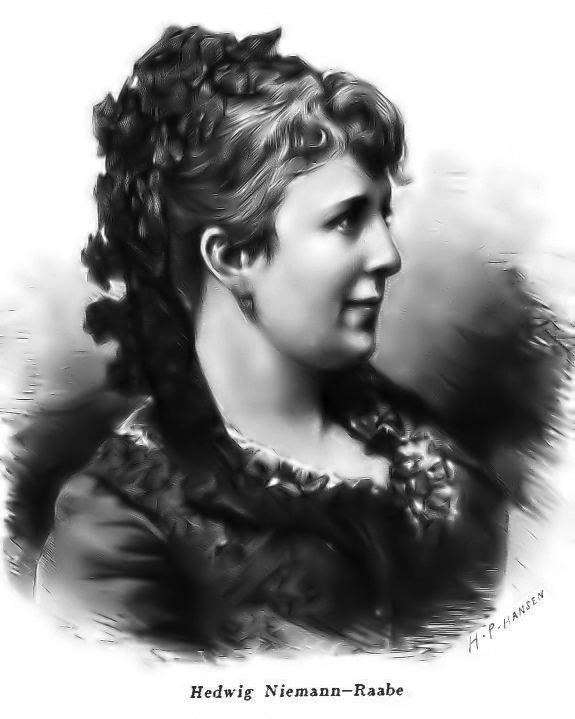
Hedwig Raabe. Portrait by Hans Peter Hansen

Hedwig Raabe (3 December 1844 – 21 April 1905) was a German actress.

== Life ==
She was born in Magdeburg, and at age 14, she was playing in the company of the Thalia theatre in Hamburg.

In 1864, she joined the German Court theatre at St Petersburg, touring across Germany in the summer with success. In 1871, she married Albert Niemann (1831–1917), the operatic tenor.

She excelled in classical roles like Marianne in Goethe's Geschwister and Franziska in Minna von Barnhelm. She is the first person who brought Ibsen's plays to Berlin.
