= Marie Seebach =

German actress (1829–1897)

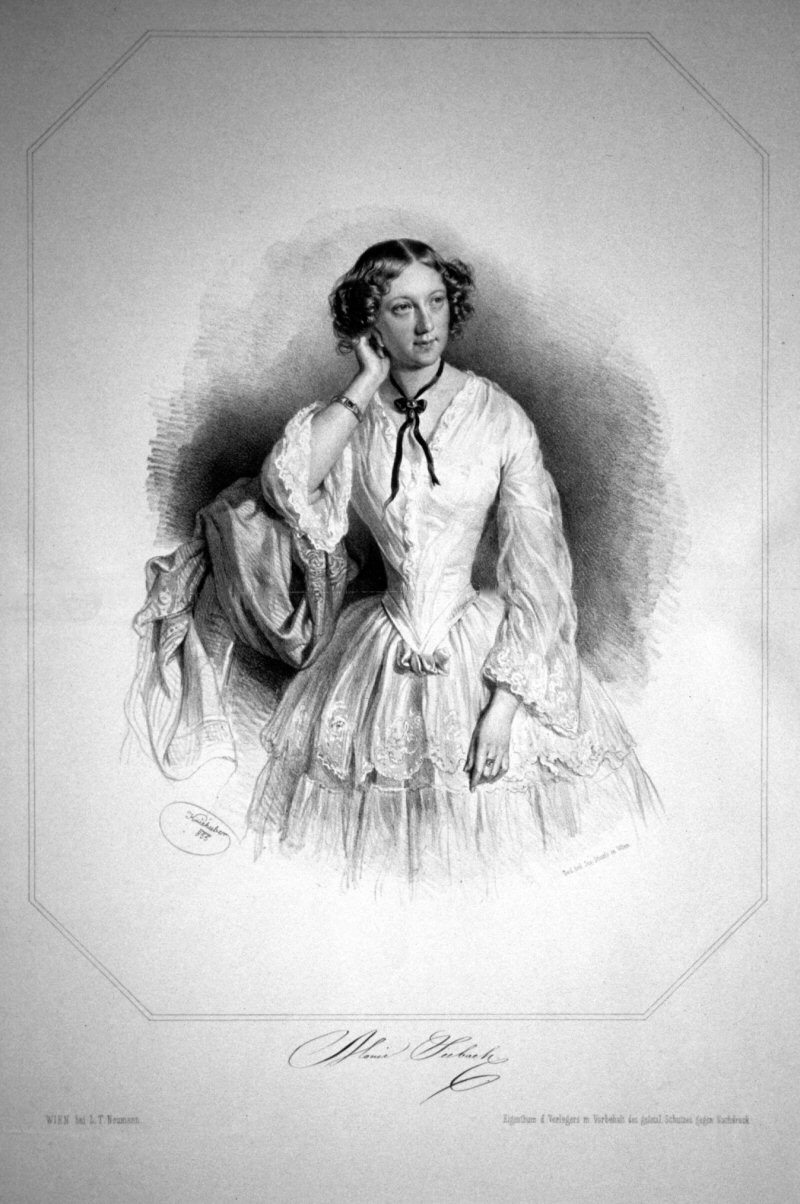
Marie Seebach

Marie Seebach (24 February 1829 – 3 August 1897) was a German actress.

== Biography ==
She was born in Riga, Livonia, Russian Empire as the daughter of an actor, Wilhelm Friedrich Seebach (1798–1863). After appearing first at Nuremberg as Julie in Kean, she played soubrette parts at Lübeck, Danzig and Cassel. In 1852 she achieved her first great success at the Thaliatheater in Hamburg as Gretchen in Goethe's Faust, and she remained there until 1854, when she appeared in Vienna.

She then played in Munich, establishing her reputation as a tragic actress with the lead roles in Jane Eyre and Adriana Lecouvreur. From 1855 to 1866 she was engaged at the court theatre at Hanover.

In Hanover, in 1859, she married the tenor Albert Niemann. In 1866 she followed her husband to Berlin, but separated from him after two years.

In 1870–1871 she visited the United States, and gave in seventeen cities no less than 160 performances mostly of Faust; and in 1886 she accepted a permanent engagement at the Schauspielhaus in Berlin. In 1895 she endowed a home for poor actors and actresses at Weimar, called the Marie Seebach Stiftung.

She retired from the stage in 1897, and died on 3 August of that year.
