= Albert Niemann (tenor) =

German opera singer

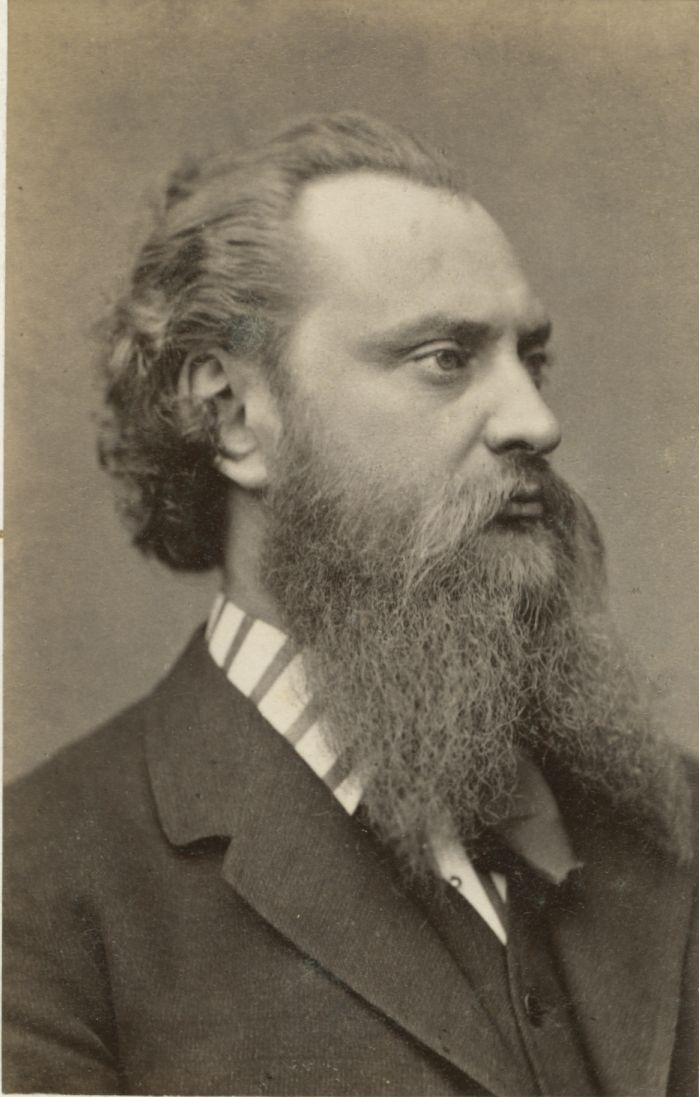

Albert Wilhelm Karl Niemann (15 January 1831 – 13 January 1917) was a leading German operatic heldentenor especially associated with the operas of Richard Wagner. He gave important premieres in France, Germany, England and the United States, and played Siegmund in the first complete production of Der Ring des Nibelungen (Bayreuth Festspielhaus 1876).

== Early career ==
Born in Erxleben, in the Prussian Province of Saxony (now Saxony-Anhalt), Niemann lost his father (an innkeeper) at an early age and was brought up by his mother, a woman 'of almost unwomanly hardness' who lived to be ninety. He was apprenticed to an engine-maker, but ran away to Dresden to make his own life. He grew up with a Germanic dedication to hunting but also student-like, reading extensively in science, history and philosophy. He was not particularly sociable or tactful, was blunt in speech and often boorish in behaviour.

Niemann made a debut in Dessau in 1849, singing in minor roles and in chorus. He received training from Fritz Schneider (director of the ducal Hofkapell), from Albert Nusch and from Gilbert Duprez in Paris. Until 1866 he had various engagements in Stuttgart, Königsberg, Stettin, and from 1854 in Hannover. At Hannover he sang Tannhäuser (from 1854), Lohengrin (from 1855) and Rienzi (from 1859).

He had a large physique and a large voice to match. In 1859 he married the soprano Marie Seebach: however it is said that this marriage ended in divorce after he threw her out of a first-floor window.

== Wagner's 'model company' ==
Niemann visited Wagner in the Asyl, at the composer's invitation, in summer 1858. Wagner had him in mind to create the role of Siegfried. From 1859, Wagner had involved Niemann (then at Hanover) in his plan to form a model German company to perform some operas, including Tristan und Isolde, in Paris in 1860. The plan was for Niemann to sing Tannhäuser and Josef Tichatschek to sing Lohengrin, alternating to rest their voices and able to replace each other if needed, and both to share a production of Tristan und Isolde as well. However, the projected Isolde, Frau Bürde-Ney, could not be released from a Leipzig contract, and the project foundered.

== The Paris Tannhäuser ==
However, Paris issued an imperial command for Tannhäuser, and Niemann obtained a nine-month contract to join these rehearsals in September 1860. Hans von Bülow had little time for Niemann, either for his forced timbre or for his loutishness towards Wagner. Over the months of the rehearsals, Niemann refused to respond to Wagner's artistic direction and, desirous but doubtful of success, would not modify his brilliant ringing tones to the mood of resignation and ghostlike tonelessness required for the final act, despite Wagner's almost superhuman patience and encouragements towards him. He had learned that a Parisian faction intended to disrupt the production, and disloyally went through with it presenting himself as the unlucky artist involved in a work unworthy of his powers. The performances were utterly disrupted, and Niemann remained disingenuously aloof from Wagner's artistic claims throughout. Baudelaire wrote that Niemann had 'sung out of tune with deplorable assiduity', and condemned 'his weaknesses, his swoons, his tantrums of a spoiled child.' The Meyerbeer press, however, took Niemann's side, and he returned to Hanover to sing Raoul in Les Huguenots.

== Continuing career ==
In 1864, Niemann sang as guest in two performances of Tannhäuser at Munich, and in one of Lohengrin by the arrangement of Ludwig II, shortly before the death of King Maximilian II of Bavaria. Ludwig invited Niemann to repeat these roles in Munich in 1866, but war intervened: in the following year he was again invited, but declined, because the usual cuts were not to be made. In 1866, he became a member of the Berlin Opera, and remained so until 1888. In April 1870, he sang Walther in the Berlin Meistersinger premiere. As Tichatschek had grown old, and after Ludwig Schnorr's death in 1865, Niemann had become one of the most experienced and advanced Wagnerian tenors. In 1871, he married the actress Hedwig Raabe.

== Bayreuth 1875–1876 ==
In May 1872 he was in the quartet of soloists (with Johanna Jachmann-Wagner, Marie Lehmann and Franz Betz) in the inaugural performance of Beethoven's Ninth Symphony at the foundation-stone laying of the Bayreuth Festspielhaus, and the gigantic Niemann made a truly heroic impression when striking the foundation-stone with a hammer. By 1874, Wagner had mentally settled on Niemann for the role of Siegmund in the complete Ring cycle as it was to be performed at Bayreuth. Wagner had involved Niemann in his discussions about the casting of the Ring, but Niemann (who had agreed to participate without remuneration), in dudgeon because Wagner wanted a younger man for the role of Siegfried, arrived at Wahnfried in 1875 for rehearsals and within three days had stormed out and injected poison into the atmosphere of exhilaration at Bayreuth.

However, his departure gave Wagner the opportunity to coach Georg Unger as Siegfried. Niemann returned to continue work in October, and in the following March he performed Tristan under Wagner's supervision in Berlin. Rehearsals were resumed in May (with a new Sieglinde), and the opening of Bayreuth was brought to completion in August 1876. Niemann sang Siegmund with Josephine Schefsky as Sieglinde and Amalie Materna as Brünnhilde. Lilli Lehmann wrote of him, 'never since have I heard or seen a Siegmund to compare with him... His intellectual power, his physical impressiveness, his incomparable expression were superb beyond words.' (Of his Tristan she remarked, 'it was certainly the most sublime thing that has ever been achieved in the sphere of music drama.') Saint-Saëns, however, considered that since the Paris 1861 Tannhäuser, time had eaten away Niemann's high notes, and he could no longer sing piano or legato.

== Later premieres ==
Niemann remained with the Berlin opera until 1888, but in the later years of his career he participated in several important tours. In 1882, he appeared as Siegmund in the first London Die Walküre, at Her Majesty's Theatre. In 1883, he was one of the twelve pall-bearers at Wagner's funeral at Wahnfried. From 1886 to 1888 he appeared at the Metropolitan Opera House, as the first American Tristan (December 1, 1886, Anton Seidl, conductor, Lilli Lehmann, Isolde), as Siegfried in the first American Götterdämmerung (January 25, 1888, with Lilli Lehmann as Brünnhilde), and in Spontini's opera Fernando Cortez. In New York, he also sang Siegmund, John of Leyden in Le prophète, Tannhäuser, Lohengrin, Florestan (in Fidelio), and Eleazar in La juive. Angelo Neumann's touring company, in which Niemann took part under Seidl's conductorship, toured with the Ring through many towns of Germany, Belgium, Holland, Switzerland, Italy, Hungary, and Austria.

Albert Niemann died in Berlin, two days short of his 86th birthday. He is buried at the Stahnsdorf South-Western Cemetery.

His son Albert Niemann (1880–1921) was the paediatrician who described Niemann–Pick disease.
