= Ludwig Pick =

German pathologist (1868–1944)

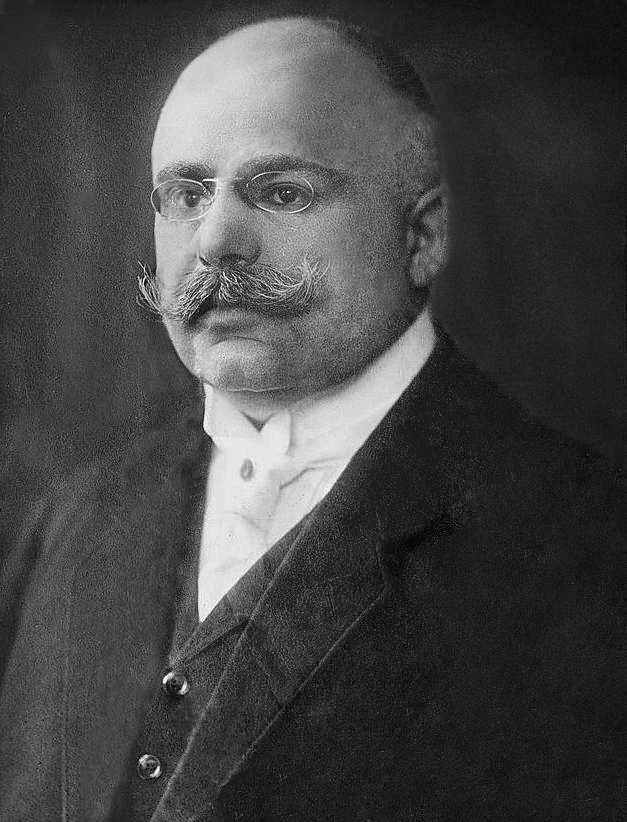
Ludwig Pick (1868–1944)

Ludwig Pick (31 August 1868 – 3 February 1944) was a German pathologist born in Landsberg an der Warthe.

In 1893, he earned his medical doctorate in Leipzig and subsequently practiced medicine at Leopold Landau's private Frauenklinik, where he remained until 1906. That same year, he became the director of the department of pathological anatomy at the city hospital Friedrichshain-Berlin. Later on, because he was Jewish, he was imprisoned by the Nazis and died on 3 February 1944 at the Theresienstadt Concentration Camp.

Ludwig Pick made several contributions to academic pathology, particularly in the field of genitourinary diseases and the study of melanotic pigmentation. In 1912, he coined the term 'pheochromocytoma' to describe the chromaffin color change in tumor cells associated with adrenal medullary tumors.

== Associated eponyms ==
- Lubarsch–Pick syndrome: A rare combination of macroglossia with systematized amyloidosis of the skin and skeletal muscles. Named with pathologist Otto Lubarsch (1860–1933).
- Niemann–Pick disease: A biochemical disorder affecting a lipid fat called sphingomyelin, which usually results in progressive enlargement of the liver and spleen (hepatosplenomegaly), along with lymphadenopathy, anemia and mental and physical deterioration. Named with Dr. Albert Niemann (1880–1921).
- Pick's cell: Histiocyte found in the spleen and bone marrow in Niemann-Pick disease. It is similar in appearance to "Gaucher's cell", however the cytoplasm of the cell appears foamy.

== Selected works ==
- Über das elastische Gewebe in der normalen und pathologisch veränderten Gebärmutter, 1900 – On elastic tissue in the normal and pathologically altered uterus.
- Die Weltanschauung Des Judentums, 1912 – The world view of Judaism.
- Die Skelettform-ossuäre Form des Morbus Gaucher, 1927 – The skeletal form in regards to Gaucher's disease.
- Der Paratyphus, 1928 – The paratyphoid.
