= Arimoclomol =

Medication

Clinical data
- Trade names: Miplyffa
- AHFS/Drugs.com: Monograph
- License data: US DailyMed: Arimoclomol
- Routes of administration: By mouth
- ATC code: N07XX17 (WHO)

Legal status
- Legal status: US: ℞-only

Identifiers
- IUPAC name: N-[(2R,Z)-2-hydroxy-3-(1-piperidyl)propoxy]pyridine-3-carboximidoyl chloride 1-oxide
- CAS Number: 289893-25-0
- PubChem CID: 208924
- DrugBank: DB05025
- ChemSpider: 21106260
- UNII: EUT3557RT5
- KEGG: D11374
- ChEMBL: ChEMBL2107726
- CompTox Dashboard (EPA): DTXSID5057701

Chemical and physical data
- Formula: C_{14}H_{20}ClN_{3}O_{3}
- Molar mass: 313.78 g·mol^{−1}
- 3D model (JSmol): Interactive image
- SMILES: O[C@H](CN1CCCCC1)CO\N=C(\Cl)c2ccc[n+]([O-])c2
- InChI: InChI=1S/C14H20ClN3O3/c15-14(12-5-4-8-18(20)9-12)16-21-11-13(19)10-17-6-2-1-3-7-17/h4-5,8-9,13,19H,1-3,6-7,10-11H2/b16-14+/t13-/m1/s1; Key:SGEIEGAXKLMUIZ-ZPTIMJQQSA-N

Arimoclomol, sold under the brand name Miplyffa, is a medication used for the treatment of Niemann–Pick disease type C. It is taken by mouth.

The most common side effects include upper respiratory tract infection, diarrhea, and decreased weight.

Arimoclomol was approved for medical use in the United States in September 2024. The US Food and Drug Administration (FDA) considers it to be a first-in-class medication.

== Medical uses ==
Arimoclomol, in combination with miglustat, is indicated for the treatment of neurological symptoms associated with Niemann-Pick disease, type C (NPC) in adults and children two years of age and older.

== Side effects ==
The most common side effects of arimoclomol include upper respiratory tract infection, diarrhea, and decreased weight.

== Mechanism of action ==
Arimoclomol is believed to function by stimulating a normal cellular protein repair pathway through the activation of molecular chaperones. Since damaged proteins, called aggregates, are thought to play a role in many diseases, CytRx believes that arimoclomol could treat a broad range of diseases.

Arimoclomol activates the heat shock response. It is believed to act at Hsp70.

== History ==
Arimoclomol was discovered by Hungarian researchers, as a drug candidate to treat insulin resistance and diabetic complications such as retinopathy, neuropathy and nephropathy. Later, the compound, along with other small molecules, was screened for further development by Hungarian firm Biorex, which was sold to CytRx Corporation, who developed it toward a different direction from 2003.

Arimoclomol (INN; originally codenamed BRX-345, which is a citrate salt formulation of BRX-220) was an experimental drug developed by CytRx Corporation, a biopharmaceutical company based in Los Angeles, California. In 2011, the worldwide rights to arimoclomol were bought by Danish biotech company Orphazyme ApS.

In September 2024, the US Food and Drug Administration (FDA) granted approval of arimoclomol to Zevra Therapeutics.

The FDA approved arimoclomol based on results of a randomized, double-blind, placebo-controlled 12-month trial in participants 2 to 19 years of age who had a molecularly confirmed diagnosis of Niemann-Pick disease, type C. Fifty participants were randomized 2:1 to treatment with weight-adjusted arimoclomol (31 to 124 mg) or placebo orally three times per day. Among these 50 participants, 39 (78%) received miglustat as background treatment in the trial. The trial was conducted at 14 sites in Europe, Great Britain, and the United States.

Efficacy was demonstrated by the rescored 4-domain Niemann-Pick disease, type C Clinical Severity Scale (R4DNPCCSS) score in the participants who used miglustat as their background treatment. The R4DNPCCSS is a measure of Niemann-Pick disease, type C disease progression that looks at four items that participants with Niemann-Pick disease, type C, their caregivers and physicians have identified as most relevant including ambulation, speech, swallow and fine motor skills. Higher scores signify a greater severity of the disease. Compared to placebo, arimoclomol resulted in a slower disease progression as measured by the R4DNPCCSS score.

== Society and culture ==
=== Legal status ===
The European Medicines Agency (EMA) and US Food & Drug Administration (FDA) granted orphan drug designation to arimoclomol as a potential treatment for Niemann-Pick type C in 2014 and 2015 respectively. In addition, the FDA has granted priority review, rare pediatric disease, fast track, and breakthrough therapy designations to arimoclomol.

Arimoclomol was approved for medical use in the United States in September 2024.

=== Names ===
Arimoclomol is the international nonproprietary name (INN).

== Research ==
Arimoclomol has been shown to extend life in an animal model of ALS and was well tolerated in healthy human volunteers in a Phase I study. CytRx is currently conducting a Phase II clinical trial.

Arimoclomol also has been shown to be an effective treatment in an animal model of Spinal Bulbar Muscular Atrophy (SBMA, also known as Kennedy's Disease).
