= A-971432 =

Chemical compound

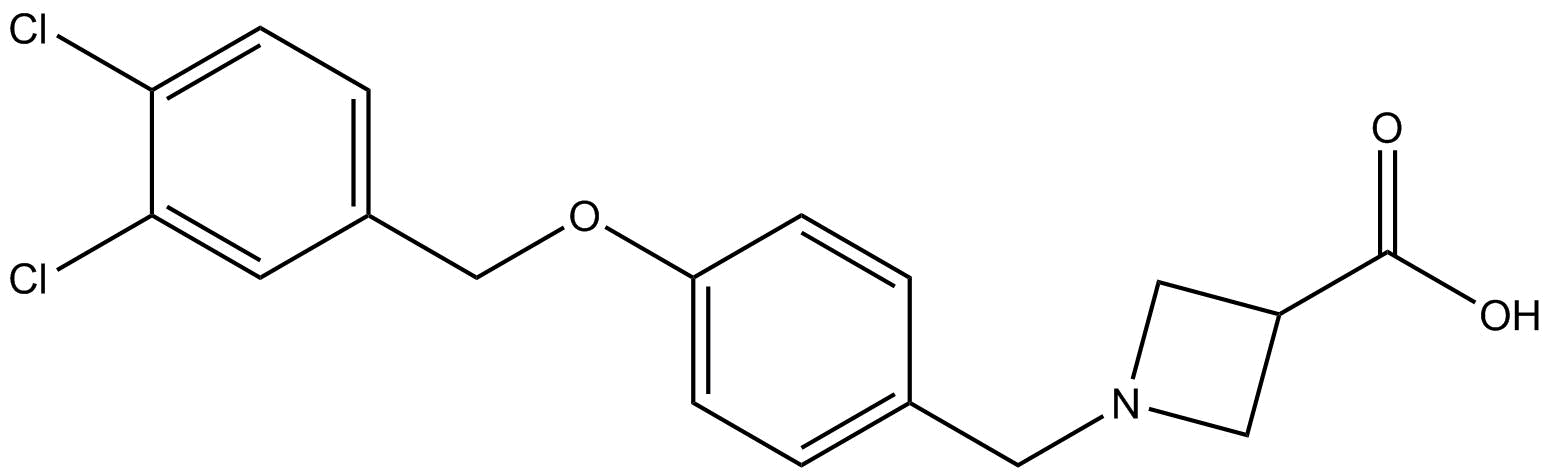

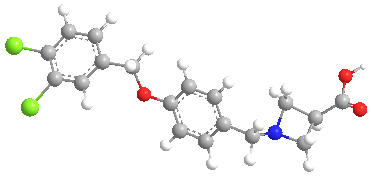
- Ball and stick structure of A-971432

Identifiers
- IUPAC name: 1-(4-((3,4-Dichlorobenzyl)oxy)benzyl)azetidine-3-carboxylic acid
- CAS Number: 1240308-45-5
- PubChem CID: 46872626
- ChemSpider: 35523147
- UNII: 3QLJ2AZ8GW
- CompTox Dashboard (EPA): DTXSID301045800

Chemical and physical data
- Formula: C_{18}H_{17}Cl_{2}NO_{3}
- Molar mass: 366.24 g·mol^{−1}
- 3D model (JSmol): Interactive image
- SMILES: C1C(CN1CC2=CC=C(C=C2)OCC3=CC(=C(C=C3)Cl)Cl)C(=O)O
- InChI: InChI=1S/C18H17Cl2NO3/c19-16-6-3-13(7-17(16)20)11-24-15-4-1-12(2-5-15)8-21-9-14(10-21)18(22)23/h1-7,14H,8-11H2,(H,22,23); Key:WAAWETUDFSIYSD-UHFFFAOYSA-N

A-971432 is an orally bioavailable selective agonist of sphingosine-1-phosphate receptor 5 (S1PR5) discovered at AbbVie. It was discovered using high-throughput chemistry. S1P5 agonists have been proposed as an innovative mechanism for the treatment of neurodegenerative disorders such as Alzheimer's disease and lysosomal storage disorders such as Niemann–Pick disease. Stimulation of S1PR5 with A-971432 has been shown to preserve blood-brain barrier integrity and exert a therapeutic effect in an animal model of Huntington's disease.
