= Epididymal secretory protein E1 =

Group of transport proteins in vertebrates

NPC2

Identifiers
- Aliases: NPC2, EDDM1, HE1, NPC intracellular cholesterol transporter 2
- External IDs: OMIM: 601015; MGI: 1915213; GeneCards: NPC2

Gene location (Human)
Chr.	Chromosome 14 (human)
Band	14q24.3	Start	74,476,192 bp
Band	14q24.3	End	74,494,177 bp

Gene location (Mouse)
Chr.	Chromosome 12 (mouse)
Band	12|12 D1	Start	84,801,336 bp
Band	12|12 D1	End	84,819,926 bp
RNA expression pattern
Bgee	Human / Mouse (ortholog); Top expressed in: corpus epididymis; tail of epididymis; lower lobe of lung; right lobe of thyroid gland; left lobe of thyroid gland; stromal cell of endometrium; right lung; caput epididymis; upper lobe of lung; gallbladder / Top expressed in: left lung lobe; gastrula; carotid body; right lung lobe; Paneth cell; decidua; vestibular membrane of cochlear duct; stroma of bone marrow; seminal vesicula; retinal pigment epithelium; More reference expression data
BioGPS	n/a
Gene ontology
Molecular function	enzyme binding; cholesterol binding; protein binding; cholesterol transfer activity; sterol binding
Cellular component	lysosome; extracellular exosome; endoplasmic reticulum; extracellular region; extracellular space; azurophil granule lumen; lysosomal lumen; intracellular anatomical structure
Biological process	intracellular sterol transport; regulation of isoprenoid metabolic process; phospholipid transport; cholesterol transport; response to virus; cholesterol homeostasis; steroid metabolic process; glycolipid transport; intracellular cholesterol transport; cholesterol metabolic process; cholesterol efflux; lipid metabolism; neutrophil degranulation; low-density lipoprotein particle clearance; lipid transport; sterol transport
Sources:Amigo / QuickGO
Orthologs
Databases	NCBI: entry; OMA: entry
Species	Human	Mouse
Entrez	10577	67963
Ensembl	ENSG00000119655	ENSMUSG00000021242
UniProt	P61916	Q9Z0J0
RefSeq (mRNA)	NM_006432; NM_001363688; NM_001375440	NM_023409
RefSeq (protein)	NP_006423; NP_001350617; NP_001362369	NP_075898
Location (UCSC)	Chr 14: 74.48 – 74.49 Mb	Chr 12: 84.8 – 84.82 Mb
PubMed search
- Wikidata
View/Edit Human	View/Edit Mouse

The epididymal secretory protein E1, also known as NPC2 (Niemann-Pick intracellular cholesterol transporter 2), is one of two main lysosomal transport proteins that assist in the regulation of cellular cholesterol by exportation of LDL-derived cholesterol from lysosomes. Lysosomes have digestive enzymes that allow it to break down LDL particles to LDL-derived cholesterol once the LDL particle is engulfed into the cell via receptor mediated endocytosis.

NPC2 works cooperatively with the NPC1 protein to facilitate the exportation of LDL-derived cholesterol out of the lysosome to regulate the concentrations of lipids and cholesterol in the body. Epididymal secretory protein E1 is a protein associated with Niemann-Pick disease, type C, which is one of the three types of the Niemann-Pick diseases (Type A, B, and C). This disease can lead to an over accumulation of cholesterol and lipids in different types of tissues, including the brain. It is caused by a mutation in the NPC2 gene that impairs the body's ability to transport lipids or cholesterol intracellularly.

== Structure ==
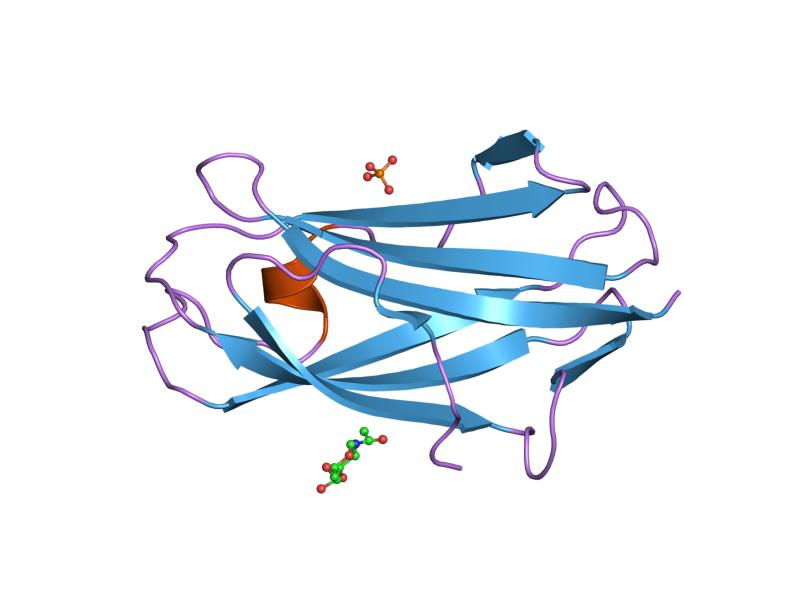
Bovine NPC2/Epididymal secretory protein E1 3D structure

The epididymal secretory protein E1 is a small soluble glycoprotein consisting of 132 amino acids that is found in a large variety of cells.

== Function ==
Lysosomal secretion of cholesterol is one part of the regulation of cholesterol in the body. LDL particles are low density lipoproteins that carry cholesterol to cells. LDL particles are engulfed into cells by receptor-mediated endocytosis. Once the LDL is engulfed this results in the budding of the receptors to disassemble from the LDL vesicle and move back up to the outer membrane of the cell. This is due to the pH on the outside of the cell being less acidic than the inside of the cell. After this budding process the lysosomes fuse with LDL particles. Lysosomes break down the LDL into cholesterol and other lipids (fatty acids), hence LDL-derived cholesterol. The epididymal secretory protein E1 (NPC2) is produced via transcription of the NPC2 gene and recruits and transfers the LDL-derived cholesterol to the sterol-binding pocket in the N-terminal domain of the NPC1 protein to be transferred from the lysosome lumen and excreted from the lysosome membrane.

== Clinical significance ==
Since the epididymal secretory protein E1 plays a role in the intracellular transport of cholesterol, a mutation in the gene that produces it (NPC2 gene) can cause serious issues that lead to Niemann-Pick disease, type C. Niemann-Pick disease, type C is a rare disorder that results in the over accumulation of lipids and cholesterol in different types of tissues in the body due to this protein being ubiquitous. Symptoms vary per individual and can be fatal at birth or go undiagnosed up until adulthood.

== See also ==
- NPC1
- Low density lipoproteins
- Receptor mediated endocytosis
- Hypercholesterolemia
