= Acetylleucine =

Compound

- Stereo, skeletal model of acetylleucine (S) (S)-(−)-N-Acetyl-leucine

Names
- IUPAC name 2-Acetamido-4-methylpentanoic acid
- Other names N-Acetylleucine; N-Acetyl-L-Leucine

Identifiers
CAS Number	Racemic: 99-15-0; S (−): 1188-21-2; R (+): 19764-30-8
3D model (JSmol)	Racemic: Interactive image
Beilstein Reference	1724849 (S)-(−)
ChEBI	Racemic: CHEBI:17786
ChEMBL	Racemic: ChEMBL174357; S (−): ChEMBL56021
ChemSpider	Racemic: 1918; S (−): 64075; R (+): 1042393
EC Number	Racemic: 202-734-9
Gmelin Reference	985259 (S)-(−)
KEGG	Racemic: D07350
MeSH	acetylleucine
PubChem CID	Racemic: 1995; S (−): 70912; R (+): 1241420
UNII	Racemic: K76S41V71X; S (−): E915HL7K2O; R (+): 91WU82GA22
- InChI: InChI=1S/C8H15NO3/c1-5(2)4-7(8(11)12)9-6(3)10/h5,7H,4H2,1-3H3,(H,9,10)(H,11,12) Key: WXNXCEHXYPACJF-UHFFFAOYSA-N
- SMILES: Racemic: CC(C)CC(NC(C)=O)C(O)=O

Properties
Chemical formula	C_{8}H_{15}NO_{3}
Molar mass	173.212 g·mol^{−1}
Appearance	White crystals
Melting point	−115 to −113 °C; −175 to −172 °F; 158 to 160 K
log P	−0.265
Acidity (pK_{a})	3.666
Basicity (pK_{b})	10.331

Pharmacology
ATC code	N07CA04 (WHO)

Related compounds
Related compounds	ENU
- Except where otherwise noted, data are given for materials in their standard state (at 25 °C [77 °F], 100 kPa). Infobox references

Acetylleucine (N-acetyl-leucine) is a modified leucine amino acid.

Two forms are commercialized: N-acetyl-DL-leucine (sold under the brand Tanganil, among others, and used in the treatment of vertigo) and N-acetyl-L-leucine (levacetylleucine, sold under the brand name Aqneursa, and used for the treatment of neurological manifestations of Niemann-Pick disease type C).
