= Cyclic alternating pattern =

Pattern of brain activity that occurs during sleep

The cyclic alternating pattern (abbreviated CAP) is a pattern of two long-lasting alternate electroencephalogram (EEG) patterns that occur in sleep. It is a pattern of spontaneous cortical activity which is ongoing and occurs in the absence of sensory stimulation. It is the reorganization of the sleeping brain challenged by the modification of environmental conditions and it is characterized by periodic abnormal electrocortical activity that recurs with a frequency of up to one minute. It is considered "the EEG marker of unstable sleep". CAP does not occur during rapid eye movement sleep (REM). In Lennox-Gastaut syndrome, CAP modulates the occurrence of clinical seizures and generalized epileptic discharges by means of a gate-control mechanism.

CAP is a marker of sleep instability and it is found during non-rapid eye movement sleep (NREM). CAP is organized into sequences of successive cycles composed of two phases, A and B. Phase A involves phasic events, in other words, not continuous. Phase A subtypes of CAP allow adaptive adjustments of ongoing states to internal and external inputs. Phase B refers to background rhythm during CAP. Furthermore, CAP involves cerebral activities and is influenced by autonomic and motor functions. Interaction between CAP and neurovegetative fluctuations and motor events determine the pathophysiology of several sleep disorders and the effect of medication on continuous positive airway pressure (CPAP) treatment which is used to treat obstructive sleep apnea (OSA).

CAP is a marker of NREM instability and is also the "master clock" that accompanies the stage transitions maintained in sleep phases, noted in both the EEG and by autonomic functions through regular fluctuations. CAP is decreased in narcolepsy, multiple system atrophy, in certain cases of drug administration, with CPAP treatment for OSA, and during night-time recovery sleep after prolonged sleep deprivation. There is a relationship present between CAP and arousals that allows for adjustments of vigilance during sleep. If there is a failure in this relationship during sleep, sleep disorders may develop.

Rechtschaffen and Kales developed the standard criteria for sleep staging in 1968. In 1992, the AASM defined arousals as markers of sleep disruption, which is harmful for sleep. According to Boselli, et al., in 1998 it was noted that spontaneous arousals are natural in sleep and increase over life.
