= Neptunium monocarbide =

Identifiers
3D model (JSmol)	Interactive image
- InChI: InChI=1S/C.Np/q-4;+4 Key: BQHWKYDILYTCLN-UHFFFAOYSA-N
- SMILES: [Np+4].[C-4]

Properties
Chemical formula	CNp
Molar mass	249 g·mol^{−1}
Appearance	black-grey crystals
Density	13.2 g/cm^{3}
Solubility in water	insoluble
- Except where otherwise noted, data are given for materials in their standard state (at 25 °C [77 °F], 100 kPa). Infobox references

Neptunium monocarbide is a binary compound of neptunium metal and carbon with the chemical formula NpC.

== Preparation ==
Heating of freshly obtained neptunium hydride with carbon at 1400 °C:

NpH_{x} + C → NpC + (x/_{2})H_{2}↑

== Physical properties ==
The compound forms black-grey crystals of cubic crystal system, space group Fm3m.
