= Levacetylleucine =

Medication

Clinical data
- Trade names: Aqneursa
- Other names: IB1001
- AHFS/Drugs.com: Monograph
- MedlinePlus: a624063
- License data: US DailyMed: Levacetylleucine
- Pregnancy category: Not recommended
- Routes of administration: By mouth
- ATC code: N07XX27 (WHO)

Legal status
- Legal status: US: ℞-only; EU: Rx-only

Identifiers
- IUPAC name: N-Acetyl-L-leucine
- CAS Number: 1188-21-2
- PubChem CID: 70912
- DrugBank: DB16956
- ChemSpider: 1918
- UNII: E915HL7K2O
- KEGG: D12967
- ChEBI: CHEBI:17786
- ChEMBL: ChEMBL56021
- PDB ligand: LAY (PDBe, RCSB PDB)
- CompTox Dashboard (EPA): DTXSID6045870
- ECHA InfoCard: 100.013.370

Chemical and physical data
- Formula: C_{8}H_{15}NO_{3}
- Molar mass: 173.212 g·mol^{−1}
- 3D model (JSmol): Interactive image
- SMILES: O=C(NC(C(=O)O)CC(C)C)C
- InChI: InChI=1S/C8H15NO3/c1-5(2)4-7(8(11)12)9-6(3)10/h5,7H,4H2,1-3H3,(H,9,10)(H,11,12)/t7-/m0/s1; Key:WXNXCEHXYPACJF-ZETCQYMHSA-N

Levacetylleucine (N-acetyl-L-leucine), sold under the brand name Aqneursa, is a medication used for the treatment of neurological manifestations of Niemann-Pick disease type C and for the treatment of ataxia. Levacetylleucine is a modified version of the amino acid leucine. It is the L-form of acetylleucine. It is taken by mouth.

The most common side effects include abdominal pain, difficulty swallowing, upper respiratory tract infections, and vomiting. The most common side effects in people with ataxia-telangiectasia were fall, skin laceration, and urinary tract infection.

Levacetylleucine was approved for medical use in the United States in September 2024, and in the European Union in January 2026. Levacetylleucine is the second medication approved by the US Food and Drug Administration (FDA) for the treatment of Niemann-Pick disease type C. The FDA considers it to be a first-in-class medication. Levacetylleucine is the first treatment approved for ataxia in people with ataxia-telangiectasia.

== Medical uses ==
Levacetylleucine is indicated for the treatment of neurological manifestations of Niemann-Pick disease type C in people weighing at least 15 kilograms (33 lb).

In September 2026, the US indication for levacetylleucine was expanded to include the treatment of ataxia in people with ataxia-telangiectasia weighing at least 15 kilograms (33 lb).

Ataxia-telangiectasia is a rare, inherited neurodegenerative disorder caused by mutations in the ATM gene. It primarily affects the nervous system, causing progressive loss of muscle control and coordination (ataxia) that typically begins in early childhood. The disease also causes small dilated blood vessels (telangiectasias), immune deficiencies, and an elevated risk of cancer. There is no cure for ataxia-telangiectasia, and treatment options for the neurological symptoms of the disease have been limited.

== Adverse effects ==
The most common side effects include abdominal pain, difficulty swallowing, upper respiratory tract infections, and vomiting.

Levacetylleucine may cause embryo-fetal harm if used during pregnancy.

== History ==
The safety and efficacy of levacetylleucine for the treatment of Niemann-Pick disease type C were evaluated in a randomized, double-blind, placebo-controlled, two-period, 24-week crossover study. The duration was twelve weeks for each treatment period. The study enrolled 60 participants. To be eligible for the study participants had to be four years of age or older with a confirmed diagnosis of Niemann-Pick disease type C and at least mild disease-related neurological symptoms. Participants could receive miglustat, an enzyme inhibitor, as background treatment in the study. The trial was conducted at eleven sites in seven countries in Europe and Australia.

The US Food and Drug Administration (FDA) granted the application for levacetylleucine priority review, fast track, orphan drug, and rare pediatric disease designations. The FDA granted approval of Aqneursa to IntraBio Inc.

The effectiveness of levacetylleucine for the treatment of ataxia-telangiectasia was evaluated in a randomized, double-blind, placebo-controlled, two-period crossover study (NCT06673056) of 73 participants aged 4 years of age or older with a confirmed diagnosis of ataxia-telangiectasia. Participants were randomly assigned to receive levacetylleucine followed by placebo, or placebo followed by levacetylleucine, with each treatment period lasting 12 weeks. Of the 73 participants (26 adults and 47 pediatric participants), 38 were female and 35 were male. The median age at treatment initiation was 13 years (range: 4 to 50 years). A total of 70 participants (96%) completed the study.

== Society and culture ==
=== Legal status ===
Levacetylleucine was approved for medical use in the United States in September 2024.

In July 2025, the Committee for Medicinal Products for Human Use (CHMP) of the European Medicines Agency adopted a positive opinion, recommending the granting of a marketing authorization for the medicinal product Aqneursa, intended for the treatment of neurological manifestations of Niemann-Pick Type C (NPC) disease in people aged six years of age or older and weighing at least 20 kilograms (44 lb). The applicant for this medicinal product is Intranio Ireland. The CHMP concluded that the active substance, levacetylleucine, could not be considered a new active substance; this conclusion was confirmed in November 2025 after re-examination of the initial opinion. Levacetylleucine was authorized for medical use in the European Union in January 2026.

=== Names ===
Levacetylleucine is the international nonproprietary name.

Levacetylleucine is sold under the brand name Aqneursa.

== Research ==
Levacetylleucine is being studied for the treatment of GM2 gangliosidoses (Tay-Sachs and Sandhoff diseases), ataxia-telangiectasia, Lewy body dementia, amyotrophic lateral sclerosis, restless legs syndrome, multiple sclerosis, and migraine.
