= Neutral Point Clamped =

Widely used topology of multilevel inverters in high-level applications

Neutral point clamped (NPC) inverters are widely used topology of multilevel inverters in high-power applications. This kind of inverters are able to be used for up to several megawatts applications. See links for more information.

The three-level neutral-point-clamped PWM inverter was proposed by Akira Nabae, Isao Takahashi, and Hirofumi Akagi in 1981.

== See also ==
- Active power filter
- Synchronverter
