= Albert Niemann (pediatrician) =

German physician (1880–1921)

Albert Niemann (23 February 1880, in Berlin – 22 March 1921, in Berlin) was a German physician. He was the son of Albert Niemann, a well known tenor with the same name.

1903 he obtained his medical doctorate from the University of Strasbourg. He later trained in pediatrics as an assistant at the Säuglingsheim (infant home), run by the Verein Säuglingskrankenhaus in Berlin. In 1918 he was named director of the Säuglingsheim at Berlin-Halensee. His primary area of research dealt with metabolism in infancy.

Niemann–Pick disease is named for him and Ludwig Pick. He was the author of Kompendium der Kinderheilkunde mit besonderer Berücksichtigung der Säuglingskrankheiten (Compendium of pediatrics with special reference to infant diseases; 1920).
