= Childhood dementia =

Group of neurodegenerative conditions

- Other names: Pediatric dementia
- Specialty: Neurology, Psychiatry, Pediatrics
- Symptoms: Loss of previously acquired developmental skills, seizures, cognitive decline
- Usual onset: Childhood or adolescence
- Duration: Progressive
- Causes: Genetic disorders, neurodegenerative diseases
- Diagnostic method: Biochemical testing, genetic testing
- Treatment: Most constituent disorders are untreatable and patients receive symptom management (medication)
- Prognosis: Severely reduced life expectancy as a whole. Median life expectancy of 9 years

Childhood dementia is an umbrella group of rare, mostly untreatable neurodegenerative disorders that show symptoms before the age of 18. These conditions cause progressive deterioration of the brain and the loss of previously acquired skills such as talking, walking, and playing.

Other symptoms and complications are the loss of movement, vision, and hearing; seizures; and cardiorespiratory, bone, and joint problems. As the conditions progress, so does their impact on life expectancy and quality of life. Due to this, most conditions in the group have a poor prognosis and cause a high degree of dependence as they progress.

Childhood dementia is genetic and progressive, distinguishing it from other sources of cognitive decline like traumatic brain injury and nutrient deficiencies.

== Classification and terminology ==
Childhood dementias are a heterogenous group of genetic neurodegenerative disorders, that present symptoms before the age of 18. They are typically monogenic (caused by mutations of a single gene).

Their main characteristics are chronic and widespread cognitive decline; loss of previously acquired developmental skills after a period of development; and behaviours and psychological symptoms of dementia (BPSD).

Childhood dementias are distinct from sources of intellectual disability in childhood that are non-progressive (e.g traumatic brain injury) or acquired (e.g nutritional deficiencies or encephalitis).

== Prognosis ==
The prognosis for childhood dementia is generally poor, with most children experiencing a significant decline in cognitive and motor function.

The impact on life expectancy depends on the individual condition, but is usually severe without treatment. It is estimated that only 25–29% of people affected survive to adulthood, and only 10% to the age of 50. The median life expectancy is around 9 years, and the average life expectancy is 16.3 years.

The causes of death are attributed to respiratory complications in the late stage of the disease (e.g. pneumonia), neurological complications (e.g. drug resistant epilepsy), and cardiac events.

== Signs and symptoms ==
By their usual definitions, childhood dementias always cause global neurocognitive decline. In some childhood dementia conditions the child's early development is indistinguishable from their healthy peers, then slows or plateaus before declining. In other childhood dementia disorders, early development may be slower than typical before declining.

This progressive decline causes difficulty concentrating, memory loss, confusion, and learning difficulties, in addition to the loss of developmental skills acquired previously, such as: walking, talking, writing, reading, and playing. Eventually the body loses its ability to function, leading to an early death.

Other symptoms and complications can occur depending on the subtype.

Other symptoms:

- Behavioral changes: Changes in one's personality, aggression, and hyperactivity.
- Motor decline: Loss of coordination, balance, and movement abilities.
- Seizures: Frequent in many forms of childhood dementia.

Other complications:

- Loss of vision or hearing.
- Cardiovascular, respiratory, and/or digestive problems
- Bone or joint problems.

== Causes ==
The majority of childhood dementia cases are caused by genetic diseases. More than 145 monogenic diseases have been identified that cause dementia with onset in childhood. Examples include lysosomal disorders such as Sanfilippo syndrome, Niemann-Pick disease type C and Neuronal Ceroid Lipofuscinoses (NCLs or Batten Disease), some mitochondrial diseases such as Leigh syndrome and peroxisomal disorders such as X-linked adrenoleukodystrophy. Two-thirds of the cases can be attributed to inborn errors of metabolism.

Most childhood dementia conditions are inherited in an autosomal recessive manner, though some, such as Hunter syndrome, are x-linked inherited and a few, such as Juvenile Huntington's Disease, are autosomal dominant.

== Diagnosis ==
Diagnosis typically involves a combination of biochemical testing and genetic testing, often performed around the age of four. Early diagnosis is crucial for managing symptoms and improving the quality of life for those affected. In most cases, childhood dementia is diagnosed after developmental regression is observed.

=== Challenges in diagnosis ===
Childhood dementia is very often diagnosed late, misdiagnosed, or not diagnosed at all. A correct diagnosis happens, on average, 2 years or more after symptoms become apparent. Additionally, children affected by childhood dementia are often misdiagnosed with:

- Autism
- Developmental or intellectual delay
- ADHD
- Others

These issues in diagnosis are attributed to the:

- rarity of individual childhood dementia disorders
- initial presenting symptoms not being specific to childhood dementia
- long wait times to access specialists
- limited access to genomic testing
- lack of longitudinal or observational data
- lack of awareness
- lack of clear pathways for diagnosis and referrals

== Management ==
Treatment of childhood dementia focuses on managing symptoms and improving quality of life.

This can include:

- Medications: Anti-seizure medications, behaviour-modifying drugs, and muscle relaxants.
- Therapies: Physiotherapy, occupational therapy, and speech therapy are used to maintain physical function for as long as possible.
- Supportive care: This includes comprehensive care to address complications related to mobility, feeding, breathing, and communication. Supportive care measures are customized for each patient and may include:

- Nutritional support, including the use of feeding tubes when swallowing becomes difficult.
- Palliative care to ensure comfort and quality of life as the disease progresses.

== Psychological impact ==
Childhood dementia can significantly affect both parents and the affected child by causing anxiety, feelings of helplessness, profound grief, and a sense of loss as the child's conditions continue to progress over time. Children with childhood dementias suffer severe sleep disturbances, movement disorders (e.g. muscle spasms, tremors), deterioration of communication skills, loss of vision and hearing, mood disorders, psychosis (including hallucinations and delusions) and incontinence. This situation can cause many emotional changes for parents and children. The psychological impacts that it has on children are confusion/frustration, loss of independence, social isolation, and fear, while parents often experience self-blame, stress, and a loss of identity. For example, sleep disturbances and behavioral difficulties can exacerbate parent distress, anxiety, sleep quality and subsequent capacity to care for their child's healthcare needs.

== Epidemiology ==
Current estimates place the incidence of childhood dementias at 1 in 1186 births. This is higher than the incidence of some diseases with more widespread awareness, such as cystic fibrosis (affecting around 1 in 3000-4000 births) and spinal muscular atrophy (around 1 in 11000 births).

Meanwhile, the estimates for the prevalence are lower, at 1 in 3484 people in the general population and 1 in 1715 among children.

== History ==
The concept of childhood dementia gained recognition in the early 20th century with the identification of Batten disease, one of the first known forms of childhood dementia, by British neurologist Frederick Batten in 1903.

== Society and culture ==
=== Awareness ===
Despite its significance, childhood dementia has a very limited amount of awareness in popular culture, the medical community, and the media. Most health professionals have limited understanding and experience with individual childhood dementia conditions.

== See also ==
- Neuronal ceroid lipofuscinosis
- Batten disease
- Lysosomal storage disease
- Childhood disintegrative disorder
