= Sleep inversion =

Reversal of sleeping tendencies

Sleep inversion or sleep-wake inversion is a reversal of sleeping tendencies. Individuals experiencing sleep-wake inversion replace diurnal habits for nocturnal habits, meaning they are active at night and sleep during the day. Common symptoms of sleep inversion include persistent wakefulness during night time hours and excessive sleepiness during the day. Sleep-wake inversion is an individual symptom, not a condition by itself. It can be due to many reasons, with the main two being circadian rhythm disorders and encephalopathies.

Individuals with the delayed sleep phase type of the disorder exhibit habitually late sleep hours and an inability to change their sleeping schedule consistently. They often show sleepiness during the desired wake period of their days. The sleep phase cycles may or may not be impaired depending on the underlying cause. For example, synucleinopathies such as MSA are known for causing REM issues alongside other sleep impairments.

Severe cases of delayed sleep phase disorder or jet-lag are non-encephalopathic causes of sleep inversion. Encephalopathic causes are varied, but the most prominent example is African trypanosomiasis, or sleep sickness, in those who end up developing CNS (Central Nervous System) involvement.

Any encephalitis or neurological issue that can cause sleep problems affect the circadian rhythm, which by extension, include sleep inversion.

== Symptoms ==
Hypnogram showing normal sleep stages (REM and non-REM) across a typical sleep cycle.

Sleep inversion is established by a reversal of the normal sleep-wake cycle, in which individuals experience wakefulness during nighttime hours and excessive sleepiness during the day. Cognitive impairment, mood disturbances, and fatigue are common side effects of an inverted sleep schedule.

In clinical populations, sleep inversion occurs alongside psychiatric conditions such as depression and anxiety, reflecting a bidirectional relationship in which disrupted sleep worsens mental health outcomes. Sleep phase cycles may also be impaired depending on the cause of irregularities, and in some cases, the entire sleep architecture, including the macrostructure and stage progression, is affected.

== Causes ==
=== Encephalopathic causes ===
Encephalopathic causes of sleep inversion are caused by conditions that directly affect brain function and disrupt the neural mechanisms that govern the sleep-wake cycle.

==== Tick-borne encephalitis ====
Tick-borne encephalitis is a viral infection that affects the brain. Studies found that some people with Tick-Borne Encephalitis developed problems with their sleep cycle. This is because Tick-Borne encephalitis affects the central nervous system, which could impact areas that regulate sleep and circadian rhythms. In rarer cases, patients developed sleep inversion, though less severe sleep problems such as fatigue and daytime sleepiness were more common. These findings suggest that tick-borne Encephalitis can disrupt patients' circadian rhythm.

=== Multiple sclerosis ===
In neuroinflammatory conditions such as multiple sclerosis, sleep inversion arises due to alterations in sleep architecture, including disruptions to sleep macrostructure and the cyclic alternating pattern. Inflammatory cytokines present in the cerebrospinal fluid of MS patients have been linked to these changes in the sleep architecture, representing a non-encephalopathic cause of sleep inversion.

=== Psychiatric and neurological dysregulation ===
Sleep inversion is strongly associated with delirium and other acute neurological states. Circadian rhythm inversion is a common symptom of delirium, and is a part of a reciprocal relationship with sleep disruption.

In parasomnia patients, disrupted neural connectivity may impair normal sleep initiation and contribute to sleep inversion. Studies using multimodal neuroimaging shows that abnormal brain connectivity in NREM parasomnia relates to disrupted sleep homeostasis, increasing vulnerability to inverted sleep patterns after sleep deprivation.

Additionally, Sleep inversion has also been observed in patients with Alzheimer's disease. Sleep disturbances in Alzheimer's patients may include nocturnal sleep fragmentation, reduced nighttime sleep duration, daytime napping, and some cases of reversed sleep-wake cycle. Research suggests that these disturbances may be linked to both degeneration of neural pathways involved in regulating sleep and wake patterns, and to other psychiatric comorbidities. Sleep inversion in Alzheimer's disease is considered part of the broader pattern of sleep disruptions associated with neurodegeneration.

=== Other causes ===
Severe cases of delayed sleep phase disorder (DSPD), jet-lag, or other circadian rhythm disorders are non-encephalopathic causes of inverted behaviors. For example, in very severe DSPD, a patient may only feel sleepy right after sunrise and having a waking time late in the day that renders them completely awake for the resulting night. Another more common example is those with jet-lag whose circadian rhythms are not entrained to the destination they have arrived at, which depending on the differences between the time zones of the original location of the traveler and the destination, may cause a temporary reversal of the rhythm until the body can adjust. Sleep inversion can also be a normal variant in the ageing population, particularly in those in care homes, without the presence of an underlying neurological or psychiatric condition.

== Effects ==
Sleep inversion has been associated with changes in cardiovascular function in otherwise healthy individuals. A study of young adults with inverted sleep patterns found reduced global longitudinal strain (GLS), indicating subtle impairment in left ventricular systolic function. Sleep inversion was independently associated with lower GLS, suggesting early subclinical cardiac dysfunction. Individuals with inverted sleep schedules also showed higher rates of smoking, reduced physical activity, and poorer dietary habits.

== History ==
The study of inverted sleep patterns has roots in 19th century European medicine, when awareness of abnormal sleep behaviors began to emerge. The formal categorization of sleep inversion as distinct from other sleep disorders developed gradually through the 20th century alongside advancements in polysomnography and circadian rhythm science. The growth of sleep medicine as a recognized research discipline helped establish standardized frameworks for identifying and classifying conditions like sleep-wake inversion.

== See also ==
- Circadian rhythm disorders
- Jet lag
- Shift work sleep disorder
- Circadian rhythm
- Delayed sleep phase disorder
- Encephalitis
- Encephalitis lethargica
- Lethargy
- Encephalopathy
