= Myelin regulatory factor =

Mammalian protein found in Homo sapiens

MYRF

Identifiers
- Aliases: MYRF, C11orf9, MRF, Ndt80, pqn-47, myelin regulatory factor, 11orf9, MMERV, CUGS
- External IDs: OMIM: 608329; MGI: 2684944; GeneCards: MYRF

Gene location (Human)
Chr.	Chromosome 11 (human)
Band	11q12.2	Start	61,752,636 bp
Band	11q12.2	End	61,788,518 bp

Gene location (Mouse)
Chr.	Chromosome 19 (mouse)
Band	19|19 A	Start	10,185,636 bp
Band	19|19 A	End	10,218,112 bp
RNA expression pattern
Bgee	Human / Mouse (ortholog); Top expressed in: middle frontal gyrus; C1 segment; inferior ganglion of vagus nerve; inferior olivary nucleus; subthalamic nucleus; ventral tegmental area; external globus pallidus; superior vestibular nucleus; dorsal motor nucleus of vagus nerve; pars reticulata / Top expressed in: pyloric antrum; epithelium of stomach; lumbar subsegment of spinal cord; mucous cell of stomach; motor neuron; yolk sac; abdominal wall; substantia nigra; optic nerve; epiblast; More reference expression data
BioGPS	n/a
Gene ontology
Molecular function	peptidase activity; hydrolase activity; DNA binding; DNA-binding transcription factor activity; identical protein binding; DNA-binding transcription factor activity, RNA polymerase II-specific; sequence-specific DNA binding
Cellular component	endoplasmic reticulum membrane; nucleus; membrane; cytoplasm; integral component of membrane; endoplasmic reticulum; nucleoplasm; Golgi apparatus; cytosol
Biological process	positive regulation of myelination; oligodendrocyte differentiation; regulation of transcription, DNA-templated; proteolysis; central nervous system myelination; central nervous system myelin maintenance; cell differentiation; positive regulation of transcription, DNA-templated; transcription, DNA-templated; oligodendrocyte development; regulation of transcription by RNA polymerase II; protein autoprocessing
Sources:Amigo / QuickGO
Orthologs
Databases	NCBI: entry; OMA: entry
Species	Human	Mouse
Entrez	745	225908
Ensembl	ENSG00000124920	ENSMUSG00000036098
UniProt	Q9Y2G1	Q3UR85
RefSeq (mRNA)	NM_001127392; NM_013279	NM_001033481
RefSeq (protein)	NP_001120864; NP_037411	NP_001028653; NP_001391042
Location (UCSC)	Chr 11: 61.75 – 61.79 Mb	Chr 19: 10.19 – 10.22 Mb
PubMed search
- Wikidata
View/Edit Human	View/Edit Mouse

Myelin regulatory factor

Identifiers
- Symbol: MYRF
- InterPro: IPR026933
- Membranome: 237
Available protein structures:
- PDB: IPR026933
- AlphaFold: IPR026933

Myelin regulatory factor (MRF), Myelin gene regulatory factor, is a protein that in humans is encoded by the MYRF gene.

== Orthologs ==
Myelin regulatory factor is encoded by the Myrf/GM98 gene in mice and by the MYRF gene in humans. The family of MyRF-like-proteins also contains the orthologues pqn-47 from C. elegans and MYRFA from Dictyostelium. All orthologs have a DNA-binding domain of high homology to the Saccharomyces cerevisiae protein Ndt80 (a p53-like transcription factor) and therefore likely act as a transcription factor.

== Function ==
MyRF is a transcription factor that promotes the expression of many genes important in the production of myelin. It is therefore of critical importance in the development and maintenance of myelin sheaths.

The expression of MYRF is specific to mature, myelinating oligodendrocytes in the CNS. It has been shown to be critical for the maintenance of myelin by these cells. Following ablation of MYRF the expression of myelin genes such as PLP1, MBP, MAG and MOG drops rapidly. Therefore, MYRF is a key regulator and likely a direct activator of the expression of these genes.

== Animal models ==
Mice that lose MYRF during adulthood present with a severe demyelination similar to that seen in animal models of multiple sclerosis. This underlines the importance of an active renewal of proteins in the myelin sheath. Further, the activity of MYRF increases during remyelination, suggesting it has a critical role in this process. Animals with repressed Myrf in a proportion of oligodendrocyte precursor cells showed a delayed functional recovery from spinal cord injury.

Myrf has been shown to be significantly downregulated in a mouse model carrying the same mutation in the NPC1 protein that is underlying Niemann-Pick type C1 disease, a neurodegenerative process in which dysmyelination is a main pathogenic factor. Therefore, a disruption of oligodendrocyte formation and myelination may be the root cause of the neurological abnormalities.
