= NPC1 =

Protein-coding gene in Humans

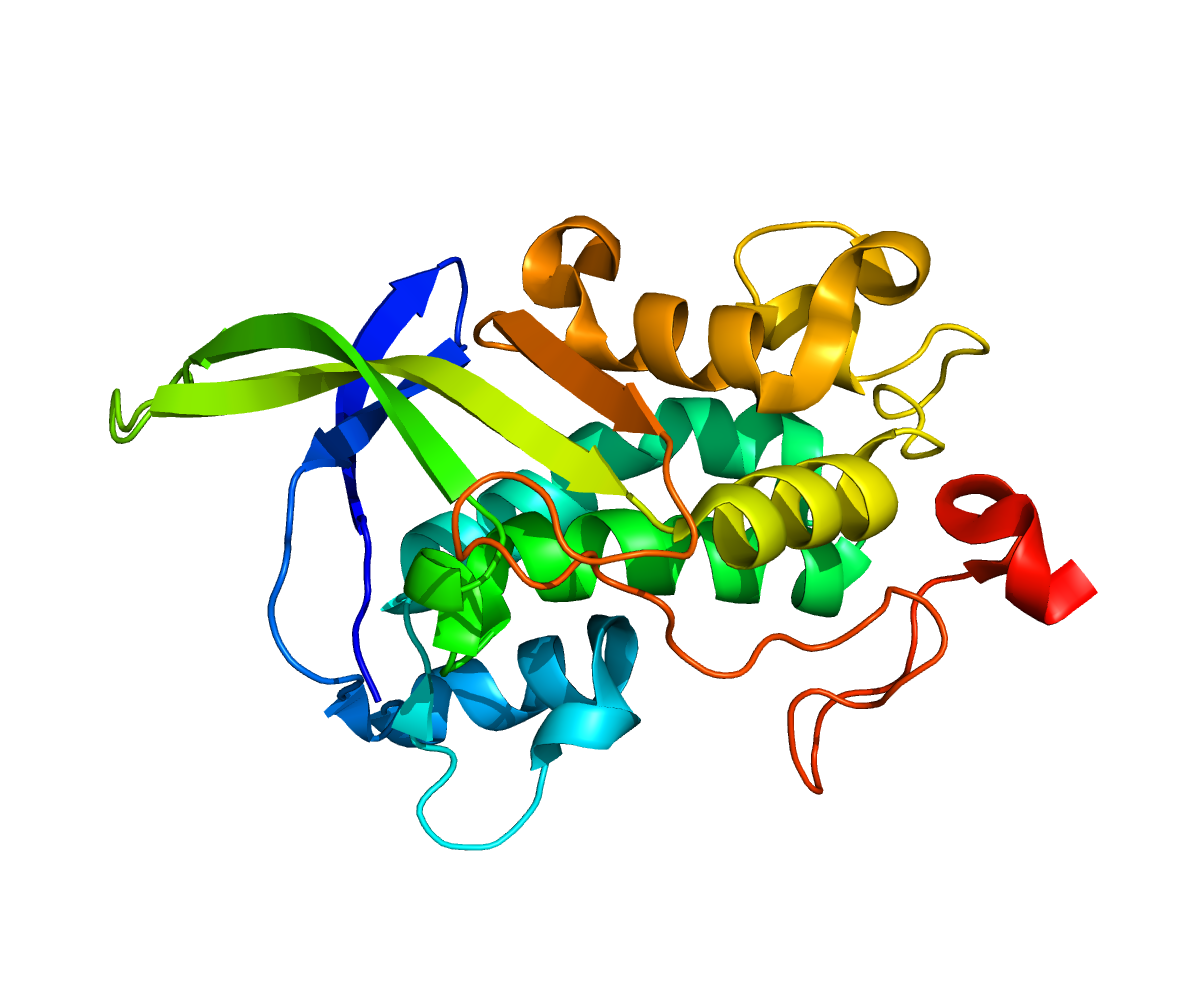

Identifiers
- Aliases: NPC1, NPC, NPC intracellular cholesterol transporter 1, SLC65A1, POGZ
- External IDs: OMIM: 607623; MGI: 1097712; GeneCards: NPC1
Available structures
PDB	Ortholog search: PDBe RCSB
PDB	List of PDB id codes 3GKH, 3GKI, 3GKJ, 5F1B, 5F18, 5HNS, 3JD8, 5I31, 5JNX

Gene location (Human)
Chr.	Chromosome 18 (human)
Band	18q11.2	Start	23,506,184 bp
Band	18q11.2	End	23,586,506 bp

Gene location (Mouse)
Chr.	Chromosome 18 (mouse)
Band	18 A1|18 6.15 cM	Start	12,322,749 bp
Band	18 A1|18 6.15 cM	End	12,369,457 bp
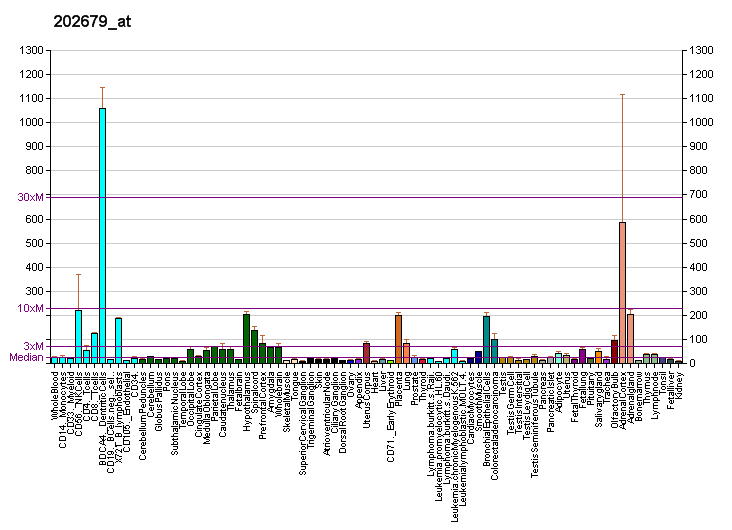
RNA expression pattern
Bgee	Human / Mouse (ortholog); Top expressed in: secondary oocyte; middle frontal gyrus; corpus callosum; C1 segment; cartilage tissue; right adrenal cortex; left adrenal cortex; inferior ganglion of vagus nerve; parotid gland; internal globus pallidus / Top expressed in: secondary oocyte; muscle of thigh; stroma of bone marrow; primary oocyte; zygote; interventricular septum; hair follicle; otic vesicle; saccule; yolk sac; More reference expression data
BioGPS	More reference expression data
Gene ontology
Molecular function	virus receptor activity; lipid transporter activity; sterol transporter activity; cholesterol binding; protein binding; transmembrane signaling receptor activity; signaling receptor activity
Cellular component	integral component of membrane; vesicle; endosome; Golgi apparatus; nuclear envelope; membrane; late endosome membrane; plasma membrane; integral component of plasma membrane; extracellular region; endoplasmic reticulum; perinuclear region of cytoplasm; membrane raft; lysosome; extracellular exosome; lysosomal membrane; integral component of lysosomal membrane
Biological process	cellular response to steroid hormone stimulus; steroid metabolic process; response to cadmium ion; endocytosis; negative regulation of macroautophagy; lipid metabolism; bile acid metabolic process; cholesterol transport; establishment of protein localization to membrane; cellular response to low-density lipoprotein particle stimulus; cholesterol metabolic process; negative regulation of cell death; autophagy; protein glycosylation; membrane raft organization; cholesterol efflux; lysosomal transport; viral entry into host cell; cholesterol homeostasis; viral process; adult walking behavior; signal transduction; low-density lipoprotein particle clearance; intracellular cholesterol transport; lipid transport
Sources:Amigo / QuickGO
Orthologs
Databases	NCBI: entry; OMA: entry
Species	Human	Mouse
Entrez	4864	18145
Ensembl	ENSG00000141458	ENSMUSG00000024413
UniProt	O15118	O35604
RefSeq (mRNA)	NM_000271	NM_008720
RefSeq (protein)	NP_000262	NP_032746
Location (UCSC)	Chr 18: 23.51 – 23.59 Mb	Chr 18: 12.32 – 12.37 Mb
PubMed search
- Wikidata
View/Edit Human	View/Edit Mouse

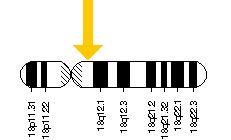
NPC1 gene is located on the long (q) arm of chromosome 18 at position 11.2.

Niemann-Pick disease, type C1 (NPC1) is a membrane protein that mediates intracellular cholesterol trafficking in mammals. In humans the protein is encoded by the NPC1 gene (chromosome location 18q11).

== Function ==
NPC1 was identified as the gene that when mutated, results in Niemann-Pick disease, type C. Niemann-Pick disease, type C is a rare neurovisceral lipid storage disorder resulting from autosomal recessively inherited loss-of-function mutations in either NPC1 or NPC2. This disrupts intracellular lipid transport, leading to the accumulation of lipid products in the late endosomes and lysosomes. Approximately 95% of NPC patients are found to have mutations in the NPC1 gene.

NPC1 encodes a putative integral membrane protein containing sequence motifs consistent with a role in intracellular transport of cholesterol and sphingosine to post-lysosomal destinations.

== Clinical significance ==
=== Obesity ===
Mutations in the NPC1 gene have been strongly linked with obesity. A genome-wide association study identified NPC1 mutations as a risk factor in childhood obesity and adult morbid obesity, and 1,416 age-matched normal weight controls. Mutations in NPC1 were also correlated with ordinary weight gain in the population. Previous studies in mice have suggested that the NPC1 gene has a role in controlling appetite, as mice with a non-functioning NPC1 gene suffer late-onset weight loss and have poor food intake. NPC1 gene variant could account for around 10 per cent of all childhood obesity and about 14 per cent of adult morbid obesity cases.

Obesity is a widely known disorder that is caused by having too high of a body fat percentage (defined as more than 25% body fat percentage for men, and more than 33% for women) — specifically a large excess of white adipose tissue — responsible for dramatically increasing the risks of developing other medical conditions such as Type 2 diabetes, high blood pressure, osteoarthritis, cancer, and many more. Being obese is different from being overweight (which is simply weighing too much or over the recommended amount) as that does not account for body fat percentage or a body fat to body weight ratio, meaning that the weight can come from other areas in the body such as bone and/or muscle. In just the United States alone, approximately 40% of Americans aged twenty and above are obese, and over 70% of Americans aged twenty and above are overweight (which includes obesity), making obesity a major health issue that must be researched and addressed further.

There are many factors that can affect obesity, including environment, diet, life-style (sedentary vs. active), genetic predisposition—and even within only the genetic component it is rarely ever just one single gene that is the main cause for obesity or increase in obesity risks. There are numerous genes (over a hundred) that can contribute to and are known to be strongly associated with or responsible for obesity. These include genes such as MC4R, LEP, LEPR, and FTO. One of the lesser known gene diseases that is known to be linked to obesity is the NPC1 disease, which is otherwise known as the Niemann-Pick disease type C1. The mutations of this gene are responsible for obesity risk factors, and not the gene itself causing obesity risk factors. The protein product of the NPC1 gene regulates cholesterol and fatty acid transports from lysosomes. It plays a crucial part in metabolism and the overall maintenance of homeostasis related to fats and lipids. One study found that NPC1 mRNA levels were increased in both fat depots, enriched in fat cells, and down-regulated by weight loss. This gene also interacts with diets consisting of high fats to increase weight gain through "differential regulation of central energy metabolism pathways." Specifically, presence of this gene showed significantly increased glycolysis and lipogenesis (which involve turning excess glucose or carbohydrates into fats). In this particular study, Castillo et al. found that when mice with the heterozygous gene (NPC1+/-) were compared to mice with the "normal" homozygous gene (NPC1+/+), heterozygous mice were more susceptible to weight gain when both groups were fed high-fat foods. (BALB/cJ Npc1 mouse models were used, which "possesses a retroposon insertion that prematurely terminates protein translation, thereby producing a nonfunctional truncated NPC1 protein".) Although this isn't a study involving humans, it can be presumed that very similar results will be obtained for people as well and provides valuable information related to this genetic disease and disorder.

NPC1 disease is an autosomal-recessive lipid storage disease. It is mostly known for cholesterol infiltration, which in turn can cause liver failure, lung failure, and even neurodegeneration. While the Niemann-Pick disease is caused by homozygous pathogenic mutations in the NPC1 gene, heterozygous mutations can still cause "highly-penetrant obesity." It was also revealed that NPC1 mutations are consistent with a model of balanced selection, where heterozygotes have higher reproductive fitness and homozygotes have lower reproductive fitness. These heterozygous mutations can account for ethnic-dependent percentage of obesity in the general population, while homozygous mutations are recently found to be more frequently appearing in South Asian populations. Results from many previous studies suggest that NPC1 plays a role in adipocyte processes which underlie causes in obesity. More research needs to be done in order to better understand the relationship of the NPC1 gene and obesity risk factors among ethnicities. There are even recent studies being done to investigate other relatedness factors of obesity and NPC1, such as age and sex, that are yet to be absolutely determined.

=== HIV-AIDS ===
Cholesterol pathways play an important role at multiple stages during the HIV-1 infection cycle. HIV-1 fusion, entry, assembly, and budding occur at cholesterol-enriched microdomains called lipid rafts. The HIV-1 accessory protein, Nef, has been shown to induce many genes involved in cholesterol biosynthesis and homeostasis. Intracellular cholesterol trafficking pathways mediated by NPC1 are needed for efficient HIV-1 production.

=== Ebola virus ===
The human Niemann–Pick C1 (NPC1) cholesterol transporter appears to be essential for Ebola virus infection: a series of independent studies have presented evidence that Ebola virus enters human cells after binding to NPC1. When cells from Niemann Pick Type C patients lacking this transporter were exposed to Ebola virus in the laboratory, the cells survived and appeared impervious to the virus, further indicating that Ebola relies on NPC1 to enter cells. The same studies described similar results with Marburg virus, another filovirus, showing that it too needs NPC1 to enter cells. In one of the studies, NPC1 was shown to be critical to filovirus entry because it mediates infection by binding directly to the viral envelope glycoprotein. A later study confirmed the findings that NPC1 is a critical filovirus receptor that mediates infection by binding directly to the viral envelope glycoprotein and that the second lysosomal domain of NPC1 mediates this binding.

In one of the original studies, a small molecule was shown to inhibit Ebola virus infection by preventing the virus glycoprotein from binding to NPC1. In the other study, mice that were heterozygous for NPC1 were shown to be protected from lethal challenge with mouse adapted Ebola virus. Together, these studies suggest NPC1 may be potential therapeutic target for an Ebola anti-viral drug.

== Mechanisms in pathology ==
In a mouse model carrying the underlying mutation for Niemann-Pick type C1 disease in the NPC1 protein, the expression of Myelin gene Regulatory Factor (MRF) has been shown to be significantly decreased. MRF is a transcription factor of critical importance in the development and maintenance of myelin sheaths. A perturbation of oligodendrocyte maturation and the myelination process might therefore be an underlying mechanism of the neurological deficits.
