= UGCG =

Protein-coding gene in the species Homo sapiens

Identifiers
- Aliases: UGCG, GCS, GLCT1, UDP-glucose ceramide glucosyltransferase
- External IDs: OMIM: 602874; MGI: 1332243; GeneCards: UGCG
Enzyme activity
| EC # | BRENDA | ExPASy | KEGG | MetaCyc |
|---|---|---|---|---|
| 2.4.1.80 | ↗ | ↗ | ↗ | ↗ |

Gene location (Human)
| Chr. | Chromosome 9 (human) |
| Band | 9q31.3 | Start | 111,896,814 bp |
| Band | 9q31.3 | End | 111,935,369 bp |

Gene location (Mouse)
| Chr. | Chromosome 4 (mouse) |
| Band | 4 32.44 cM|4 B3 | Start | 59,189,257 bp |
| Band | 4 32.44 cM|4 B3 | End | 59,222,833 bp |
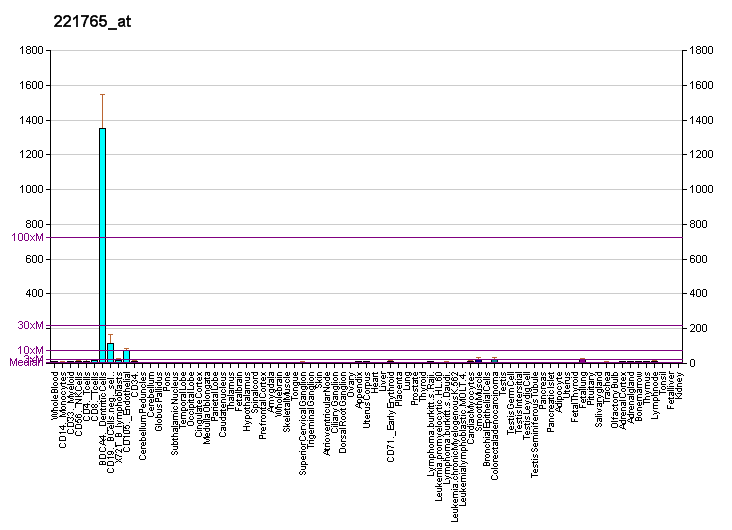

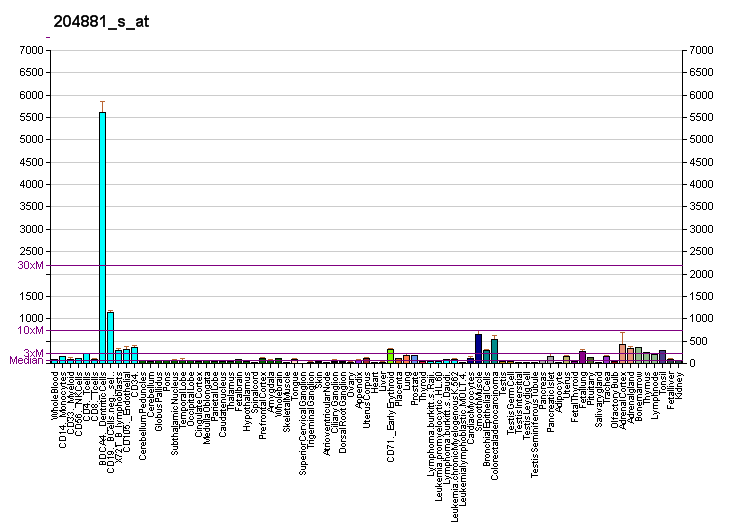
RNA expression pattern
| Bgee | Human / Mouse (ortholog); Top expressed in: skin of thigh; bronchial epithelial cell; jejunal mucosa; vena cava; trabecular bone; epithelium of nasopharynx; pericardium; cartilage tissue; buccal mucosa cell; bone marrow / Top expressed in: decidua; morula; morula; gastrula; esophagus; lymph node; jejunum; tail of embryo; ileum; secondary oocyte; More reference expression data |
| BioGPS | More reference expression data |
Gene ontology
| Molecular function | glycosyltransferase activity; transferase activity; ceramide glucosyltransferase activity; dihydroceramide glucosyltransferase activity; protein binding |
| Cellular component | integral component of membrane; Golgi membrane; Golgi apparatus; membrane |
| Biological process | glycosphingolipid biosynthetic process; glycosphingolipid metabolic process; glucosylceramide biosynthetic process; epidermis development; lipid metabolism; sphingolipid metabolic process; cell differentiation; neuron development; establishment of skin barrier; intestinal lipid absorption; protein lipidation; regulation of signal transduction; keratinocyte differentiation; leptin-mediated signaling pathway; cornified envelope assembly |
Sources:Amigo / QuickGO
Orthologs
| Databases | NCBI: entry; OMA: entry |
| Species | Human | Mouse |
| Entrez | 7357 | 22234 |
| Ensembl | ENSG00000148154 | ENSMUSG00000028381 |
| UniProt | Q16739 | O88693 |
| RefSeq (mRNA) | NM_003358 | NM_011673 |
| RefSeq (protein) | NP_003349; NP_003349.1 | NP_035803 |
| Location (UCSC) | Chr 9: 111.9 – 111.94 Mb | Chr 4: 59.19 – 59.22 Mb |
| PubMed search |
- Wikidata
| View/Edit Human | View/Edit Mouse |

Ceramide glucosyltransferase is an enzyme that in humans is encoded by the UGCG gene.

Glycosphingolipids (GSLs) are a group of membrane components that contain lipid and sugar moieties. They are present in essentially all animal cells and are believed to have important roles in various cellular processes. UDP-glucose ceramide glucosyltransferase catalyzes the first glycosylation step in glycosphingolipid biosynthesis. The product, glucosylceramide, is the core structure of more than 300 GSLs. UGCG is widely expressed and transcription is upregulated during keratinocyte differentiation.

== Interactions ==
UGCG has been shown to interact with RTN1.
