= Generative artificial intelligence in electronic health records =

Generative artificial intelligence (AI) in electronic health records (EHRs) refers to the use of generative AI systems, particularly large language models (LLMs) (LLMs), to produce or summarize clinical information. These systems can draft clinical notes, summarize patient records, and generate responses to patient messages. One application is the ambient AI scribe which processes conversations between clinicians and patients to produce draft clinical notes for clinician review.

Adoption of generative AI in EHR systems increased after Epic Systems announced a partnership with Microsoft in April 2023 to integrate generative AI into its software. By early 2025, approximately 60 companies offered ambient documentation products. In February 2026, Epic introduced its own ambient documentation tool, AI Charting, as part of its Art clinician AI suite.

Studies have reported reductions in clinician documentation time and burnout in some settings, although results vary across systems and clinical environments. The technology has also raised concerns about documentation accuracy, including omissions, hallucinations, and speech-recognition errors. Researchers have identified additional concerns involving patient privacy, consent, and differences in speech-recognition accuracy across speakers.

== Background ==
Electronic health records (EHRs) are digital records containing patient information, including medical histories, diagnoses, medications, laboratory results, imaging reports, and clinical notes. Authorized healthcare professionals use EHRs to access and update patient information across healthcare settings.

Electronic medical records (EMRs) generally refer to digital records used within a single medical practice or healthcare organization. EHRs are designed to support the exchange of patient information between different healthcare providers and institutions.

Common EHR platforms in the United States include Epic, Oracle Health (formerly Cerner), and MEDITECH. These systems are used by healthcare organizations to store patient information and manage clinical documentation.

Generative AI refers to artificial intelligence systems that produce content, including text, images, and audio, based on patterns learned from training data. Many generative AI applications in healthcare use large language models, which are trained on large datasets of text to process and generate language. Unlike traditional AI systems designed primarily to classify information or make predictions, generative AI systems can produce new content based on information provided to them.

Documentation burden has been identified as a contributor to clinician burnout. Reducing the time physicians spend creating and updating medical records has been cited by healthcare organizations as a reason for adopting ambient AI scribes.

In April 2023, Epic and Microsoft announced a collaboration to integrate Microsoft Azure OpenAI Service into Epic’s EHR platform. UC San Diego Health, UW Health, and Stanford Health Carewere among the organizations that began piloting AI-assisted drafting of patient message responses. In June 2023, Microsoft subsidiary Nuance Communications announced the integration of its Dragon Ambient eXperience Express (DAX Express) product with Epic. Other companies developing ambient AI documentation technologies include Abridge, Ambience Healthcare, Suki, and Nabla.

In February 2026, Epic introduced AI Charting as part of its Art clinician AI suite. The tool provides ambient clinical documentation within Epic’s EHR platform, listening to patient-provider conversations and generating draft clinical notes and suggested orders. Given its widespread adoption among U.S. hospitals, Epic’s integration of generative AI into its EHR platform has implications for the broader ambient documentation market.

== Applications ==
=== Clinical Documentation ===
Ambient AI scribes record conversations between clinicians and patients and use AI to generate draft clinical notes. Clinicians can review and edit the generated notes before finalizing them for inclusion in the patient’s medical record.

Unlike conventional dictation tools, which primarily transcribe speech, ambient AI documentation tools can generate clinical notes from patient-provider conversations. Some products can also suggest orders based on information discussed during the encounter.

=== Patient Message Drafting ===
Generative AI tools can draft responses to messages sent through EHR patient portals. Epic's initial generative AI feature, introduced through its 2023 collaboration with Microsoft, generated suggested responses in its In Basket messaging system for clinicians to review and edit before sending. In March 2024, an Epic executive reported that the system had generated multiple millions of message drafts.

=== Chart Summarization ===
Generative AI can summarize information contained in a patient’s electronic health record, including previous clinical notes and other clinical information. Epic’s integration with Microsoft included AI-assisted summarization capabilities within its EHR platform. These tools can condense a patient’s medical history and previous clinical encounters into shorter summaries to help clinicians review relevant information more efficiently.

== Benefits ==
=== Reduced Clinician Documentation Burden ===
Generative AI documentation tools are intended to reduce the time clinicians spend creating and updating medical records. By generating draft notes from patient encounters, these systems may reduce manual data entry and the need to complete documentation after scheduled appointments.

A randomized trial published in NEJM AI in 2025 evaluated two ambient AI scribe systems, Microsoft's DAX Copilot and Nabla, among 238 outpatient physicians across 14 specialties. Physicians were assigned to use one of the systems or continue their usual documentation practices over a two-month period. The study found that physicians using Nabla spent 9.5% less time per note than the control group. The reduction in documentation time among DAX Copilot users was not statistically significant. Both systems were associated with modest improvements in some measures of physician burnout and task load. The researchers also identified occasional clinically significant inaccuracies in generated notes.

Observational studies of larger deployments have also reported changes in documentation time. At The Permanente Medical Group in Northern California, 7,260 physicians used an ambient AI scribe in approximately 2.58 million patient encounters between October 2023 and December 2024. An analysis of the deployment estimated that the system saved 15,791 hours of documentation time during the evaluation period.

A separate study at the University of California, San Francisco (UCSF) found that 86.5% of surveyed physicians perceived a reduction in documentation time after adopting ambient scribes, although objectively measured time savings were more modest.

A March 2025 report by the Peterson Health Technology Institute, based on interviews with health systems, AI vendors, and industry experts, found evidence that ambient scribes could reduce clinician burnout and cognitive workload, but that evidence of financial returns remained limited. At Mass General Brigham, a six-week pilot survey reported a 40% relative reduction in clinician burnout among participants using ambient AI documentation.

A 2026 observational study published in JAMA Network Open examined 1,565 physicians and approximately 1.2 million ambulatory encounters at UCSF. Physicians who adopted ambient AI scribes handled an average of 0.80 more encounters per week, representing a 2.8% increase in visit volume, and generated more relative value units (RVUs). The study found no evidence of an increase in claim denials.

=== Clinical Workflow ===
Generative AI may also affect how clinicians review and manage patient information. AI-powered summarization tools can condense information from electronic health records, while ambient documentation systems generate draft clinical notes from patient-provider conversations.

The effects on workflow vary across healthcare organizations and clinical settings. Research has reported improvements in some measures of documentation burden and physician well-being, but reductions in documentation time have differed between systems, and evidence of consistent productivity and financial benefits remains limited.

== Limitations ==
=== Factual Errors and Hallucinations ===
Generative AI systems can produce text that is fluent but inaccurate or unsupported by the source material, commonly referred to as hallucinations. In clinical documentation, these errors can include omitted information, incorrectly recorded details, or statements that were never made during the encounter. In a randomized trial of two commercial ambient AI scribes, researchers identified occasional clinically significant inaccuracies in notes generated by both systems.

Transcription tools have also drawn scrutiny. In October 2024, the Associated Press reported fabricated text, including invented medical treatments, in transcripts produced by OpenAI's Whisper. The report also described a Whisper-based clinical tool that deleted the original audio, potentially making transcription errors more difficult to identify.

=== Documentation Quality ===
AI-generated notes may omit relevant clinical details even when they are clearly written. A 2025 Journal of Medical Internet Research study evaluating two ambient digital scribe products identified errors in 31 of 44 draft notes (70%), with omissions accounting for the largest share of errors. Clinicians may therefore need to review and edit AI-generated documentation before finalizing it. In a report on a Whisper-based clinical documentation tool, the Associated Press noted that the product required medical providers to edit and approve generated notes.

== Risks ==
=== Patient Safety ===
Errors in AI-generated patient communications can create risks for patient safety. In a 2024 study published in The Lancet Digital Health, researchers used GPT-4 to draft replies to 100 simulated cancer-patient questions. Physicians rated 82.1% of the drafts as safe and 58.3% as acceptable to send without editing. If left unedited, 7.1% of responses could have posed a risk to patients, and 0.6% could have posed a risk of death. The authors found that errors more often involved misjudging the urgency of a situation than providing factually incorrect medical information.

=== Automation Bias ===
Automation bias refers to the tendency to over-rely on automated recommendations. The Lancet Digital Health study found preliminary evidence that physicians anchored on the model’s suggestions. The study’s senior author also cautioned that clinicians could overlook errors even when reviewing AI-generated drafts.

== Ethical and Legal Considerations ==
=== Data Privacy and Security ===
Ambient scribes process audio recordings of confidential conversations between clinicians and patients, raising questions about how recordings and associated medical information are collected, stored, accessed, and shared. Healthcare organizations must consider applicable privacy and security laws when selecting and implementing these systems.

=== Patient Consent and Transparency ===
In November 2025, a patient filed a proposed class-action lawsuit against Sharp HealthCare in San Diego Superior Court. The complaint alleges that a July 2025 appointment was recorded using Abridge’s ambient documentation app without the patient’s consent. The lawsuit invokes California’s requirement that all parties consent to the recording of confidential conversations. The allegations have not been established in court.

California Assembly Bill 3030, effective January 1, 2025, requires covered health facilities, clinics, and physician practices that use generative AI to produce patient communications about clinical information to disclose the use of AI and provide instructions for contacting a human healthcare provider. Communications read and reviewed by a licensed or certified healthcare provider are exempt from these requirements.

=== Physician Accountability ===
Clinicians may remain professionally and legally responsible for the accuracy of AI-generated documentation they approve. A 2025 commentary in npj Digital Medicine identified liability for AI-related documentation errors as an unresolved issue, while a 2026 study of UK general practitioners noted that existing UK and Australian regulations place responsibility for the accuracy of medical records on clinicians.

=== Algorithmic Bias ===
Ambient scribes rely on speech recognition, whose accuracy can vary across speakers. A 2025 commentary in npj Digital Medicine described evidence of higher speech-recognition error rates for African American speakers and raised concerns about disparities affecting people with non-standard accents and limited English proficiency. In an August 2025 survey of 1,003 UK general practitioners, current users of ambient scribes most frequently reported increased error risk in multiparty consultations, complex medical histories and encounters involving patients whose primary language was not English. The commentary’s authors recommended independent validation of these systems and greater transparency from vendors about their error rates.

== Media Representation ==
The second season (2026) of the HBO Max medical drama The Pitt features a new attending physician, Baran Al-Hashimi (Sepideh Moafi), who promotes a generative AI charting tool and tells colleagues it can reduce charting time by 80%. The series depicts the tool making an error in a patient’s chart that affects the patient’s care. The show’s creators said they consulted experts about the benefits and drawbacks of AI while developing the storyline. Physician-commentator Robert Pearl criticized the character’s claim that the tool is 98% accurate as misleading without further context.
