= Digital pill =

Pharmaceutical dosage with ingestible sensor

A digital pill (also known as a smart pill, or ingestible sensor) is a pharmaceutical dosage form that contains an ingestible sensor inside of a pill. The sensor begins transmitting medical data after it is consumed. The technology that makes up the pill, as well as the data transmitted by the pill's sensor, are considered to be part of digital medicine. The purpose of the sensor is to determine whether the person is taking their medication or not (called "compliance").

There are privacy concerns with respect to who receives the data and what is done with it. Such concerns, along with uncertain economic benefits, have made the broad introduction of digital pills in the healthcare practice challenging, despite an accumulating body of clinical evidence indicating their efficacy and safety.

== Overview ==
Otsuka Pharmaceutical Co., Ltd. (Otsuka) and Proteus Digital Health (Proteus) were the first to be granted approval for a digital medicine system by the FDA.

The first emergence of a swallowable electronic device was in 1957, this device used radio frequency to transmit temperature and pressure readings. The field lay stagnant until technology caught up with invention in the 1990s. The first digital pill to be approved by the United States Food and Drug Administration (FDA), a version of aripiprazole (Abilify) manufactured by Otsuka Pharmaceutical, was approved in November 2017. This digital pill's sensor, developed by Proteus Digital Health, is activated by acid in the stomach, and generates an electrical signal that is picked up by a patch worn on the ribcage; the patch in turn forwards information to a smartphone app. The drug is taken by people with schizophrenia. People with the condition tend to have problems with adherence, and the digital pill could help with that; however, some people with schizophrenia have paranoia which the digital pill could make worse.

== Types ==
The most common types of ingestible sensors are used for imaging, sensing different types of gasses, to monitor medication compliance or absorption of medication, and electrochemical signal sensing.

=== Imaging ===
Images and video require the highest bandwidth for data delivery. Ingestible capsules containing video cameras are used for generating images of the macroscopic structures of hollow organs, such as the stomach and small bowel. These devices are powered by batteries, can transmit video at up to 2.7 Mbit/s, and are less invasive than other traditional endoscopic imaging devices.

=== Gas sensing ===
Gas sensing capsules utilize a gas-permeable membrane surrounding an electrochemical gas sensor and are primarily used to detect the partial-pressures of different gasses produced as the byproduct of metabolic reactions by bacteria in the intestines. The presence of gasses like carbon dioxide and methane in the gut provides useful data for analysis of metabolic and digestional health. This internal measurement of a body's organs provides a superior analysis in terms of accuracy and reliability as compared to the traditional technique of breath-test analysis.

=== Medication monitoring ===
Ingestible sensors that are specific for the monitoring of the absorption of medication or compliance will also signal the user that medication needs to be taken. These are activated in the stomach by pH differences and will transmit via Bluetooth.

=== Electrochemical sensing ===
Voltammetry can be used in vitro on stool liquid as a Gi tract diagnostic tool. The device would be able to perform cyclic, square wave, and differential pulse voltammetries.

== Sensing targets ==
Due to the nature of ingestible sensors, they are optimized for passage through hollow organs. This makes them ideal for data collection throughout the digestive tract, which includes multiple organs between the mouth and anus.

=== Oral cavity ===
The most common clinical targets for the ingestible sensor in the oral cavity would aid in the determination of: electrolyte imbalances, body metabolism based on chemical makeup of saliva, hormonal imbalances, infectious conditions, i.e. HIV and viral hepatitis, allergy disorders and cancer.

=== Esophagus ===
Digital pills that have imaging capabilities are used in endoscopy to look for inflammation and lacerations in the esophagus. The mucosa contained in the esophagus can also be tested to look for issues such as eosinophilic esophagitis.

=== Stomach ===
The pH value of the stomach is important for proper digestion and is something that can be detected by certain types of digital pills. Stomach enzymes and electrolyte production are also able to be detected by a digital pill. These pills can also search for specific bacteria in various areas of the body. For example, digital pills can be programmed to search for helicobacter pylori in the stomach, which is known to be a cause of ulcers.

=== Colon ===
The potential targets would be to monitor stool (colonic content) for medical diagnosis of infection (parasite, viral, or bacterial sources), poor nutrient absorption, or colon cancer. Also, the ingestible sensor could do an internal colonoscopy that would be less invasive than traditional.

== Power sources ==
Most digital pills use silver-oxide batteries. Lithium ion batteries are dangerous to the human bodies digestive system and therefore cannot be used.

== Locomotion ==
Most digital pills rely on passive locomotion, or allowing the body's digestive system to do all the work moving the pill, however some pills do utilise active locomotion. One active locomotion method is to include a small magnet in the digital pill that can then be activated by an external magnetic field, which can then move the pill from outside the body.

== Safety ==
It is possible that the digital pill and pacemakers may interfere with each other, however, this has not been verified.
