= Rupa Sarkar =

Biologist

Rupa Sarkar is the Editor-in-Chief of The Cochrane Collaboration. Previously, she had been Editor-in-Chief of The Lancet Digital Health, a gold open access medical journal in the Lancet family published by Elsevier.

Sarkar earned her PhD at Imperial College London, where she studied RNA biology and its role in human stem cell differentiation. Afterwards she did postdoctoral research at the Albert Einstein College of Medicine, then worked as an associate editor at Nature Protocols, was a senior editor at Genome Biology, then Chief Editor at Nature Protocols. She became founding Editor-in-Chief at The Lancet Digital Health in 2018.
