= Digital medicine =

Digital medicine refers to the application of advanced digital technologies, such as artificial intelligence, machine learning, and big data analytics, to improve patient outcomes and healthcare delivery. It involves the integration of technology and medicine to facilitate the creation, storage, analysis, and dissemination of biological and medical insights, with the aim of enhancing fundamental understandings of biology, clinical decision-making, improving patient care, and reducing costs. It has seen recent growth with the addition of multiple data types for this purpose (multi-omic data).

Digital medicine encompasses a wide range of disciplines, including techbio, healthtech, and biomedical engineering. It involves the use of digital tools and platforms to collect, store, and analyze medical and biological data, including electronic health records, genomic data, and medical imaging. This data can then be used to develop new analytics and treatment approaches, personalize healthcare interventions, and optimize healthcare delivery.

Digital medicine is evidence-based, and its approach is rooted in rigorous scientific research and clinical evidence. It is designed to augment and complement traditional medical practices, providing physicians and other healthcare professionals with the tools and resources they need to make more informed decisions and provide better care to patients.

== Differentiation from similar disciplines ==
Digital medicine is sometimes confused with similar disciplines, including the broader category of digital health, as well as digital therapeutics, another digital health subset. Digital health offerings use digital technologies to enhance human health in some capacity but often lacking the required evidence base to qualify as digital medicine. Within this broader category, programs that include a prescription medication with an ingestible sensor component are considered digital medicines. By contrast, digital therapeutics are associated mainly with web-based health management tools and stand-alone health apps, generally without a prescription medication element.

== Approval pathways ==
The ingestible sensor component associated with digital medicines was originally approved in 2012 by the U.S. Food and Drug Administration (FDA) through the Center for Devices and Radiological Health via a de novo pathway for novel, low-risk medical devices. This approval has been accompanied by FDA 510(k) clearances. The ingestible sensor is CE marked in Europe. A New Drug Application for the first fully integrated pharmaceutical with ingestible sensor component, Otsuka Pharmaceutical's ABILIFY MYCITE® (aripiprazole with Proteus ingestible sensor), was approved by the FDA in November 2017.

With its approval of the digital pill, the FDA confirmed that the review of digital medicines includes assessment of the ingestible device component, and that no additional safety and efficacy data is required for the original pharmaceutical.

== Indications ==
Digital medicines are being used for a variety of conditions in commercial and clinical settings. Medications with ingestible sensors are being prescribed in the treatment areas of hypertension, diabetes, hypercholesterolemia, heart failure, Hepatitis C, mental health, HIV, TB and organ transplantation.

In January 2016, Barton Health became the first institution to commercially offer digital medicines to patients with chronic medical conditions. In 2016, Children's Health in Dallas, Texas became the first to commercially use digital medicines with pediatric patients.

== Ethical concerns ==
Bioethicists have expressed concerns around technologies that log and share information about patients’ medication-taking behavior. These concerns exist from the perspective of both individual and collective patient rights. However, proponents note that participation in digital medicine programs are voluntary, comply with all applicable laws and standards, and protect patient data in accordance with applicable state and federal privacy regulations, as with other data generated and stored in electronic medical records. Experts add that digital medicine programs show promise as a solution to medication adherence, and help physicians more accurately titrate dosages and determine how well the medication worked.
