= Aripiprazole =

Atypical antipsychotic medication

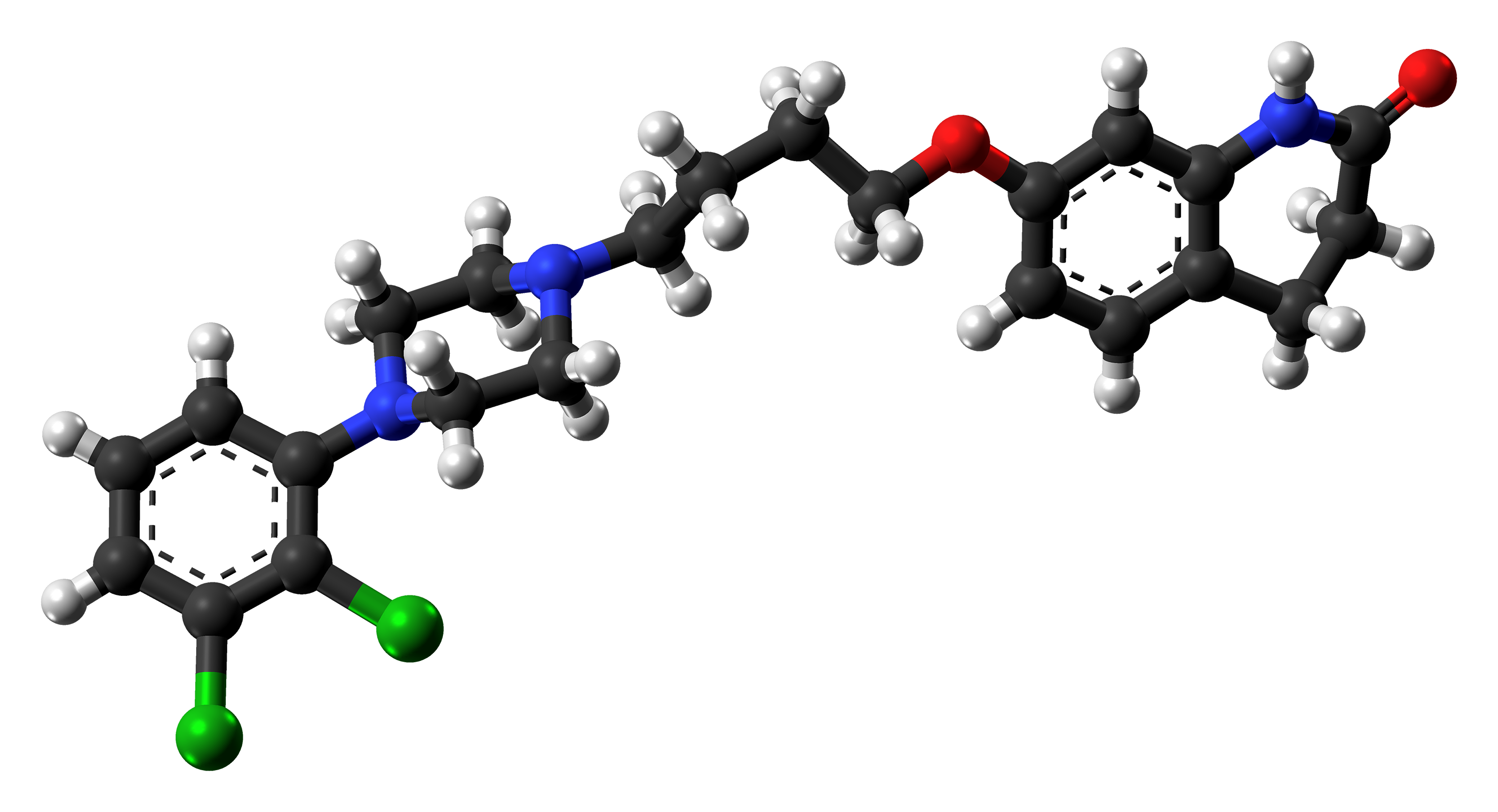

Clinical data
- Pronunciation: /ˌærɪˈpɪprəzoʊl/ AIR-ih-PIP-rə-zohl; Abilify /əˈbɪlɪfaɪ/ ə-BIL-if-eye
- Trade names: Abilify, others
- Other names: OPC-14597; OPC14597; OPC-31; OPC31; RDC-3317
- AHFS/Drugs.com: Monograph
- MedlinePlus: a603012
- License data: US DailyMed: Aripiprazole
- Pregnancy category: AU: C
- Routes of administration: By mouth, intramuscular
- Drug class: Atypical antipsychotic
- ATC code: N05AX12 (WHO)

Legal status
- Legal status: AU: S4 (Prescription only); BR: Class C1 (Other controlled substances); CA: ℞-only; NZ: Prescription only; UK: POM (Prescription only); US: ℞-only; EU: Rx-only

Pharmacokinetic data
- Bioavailability: 87%
- Protein binding: >99%
- Metabolism: Liver (mostly via CYP3A4 and 2D6)
- Metabolites: Dehydroaripiprazole
- Elimination half-life: 75 hours (active metabolite is 94 hours)
- Excretion: Kidney (27%; <1% unchanged) feces (60%; 18% unchanged)

Identifiers
- IUPAC name: 7-{4-[4-(2,3-Dichlorophenyl)piperazin-1-yl]butoxy}-3,4-dihydroquinolin-2(1H)-one
- CAS Number: 129722-12-9
- PubChem CID: 60795
- IUPHAR/BPS: 34
- DrugBank: DB01238
- ChemSpider: 54790
- UNII: 82VFR53I78
- KEGG: D01164
- ChEBI: CHEBI:31236
- ChEMBL: ChEMBL1112
- CompTox Dashboard (EPA): DTXSID3046083
- ECHA InfoCard: 100.112.532

Chemical and physical data
- Formula: C_{23}H_{27}Cl_{2}N_{3}O_{2}
- Molar mass: 448.39 g·mol^{−1}
- 3D model (JSmol): Interactive image
- Melting point: 138 to 150 °C (280 to 302 °F)
- SMILES: Clc4cccc(N3CCN(CCCCOc2ccc1c(NC(=O)CC1)c2)CC3)c4Cl
- InChI: InChI=1S/C23H27Cl2N3O2/c24-19-4-3-5-21(23(19)25)28-13-11-27(12-14-28)10-1-2-15-30-18-8-6-17-7-9-22(29)26-20(17)16-18/h3-6,8,16H,1-2,7,9-15H2,(H,26,29); Key:CEUORZQYGODEFX-UHFFFAOYSA-N

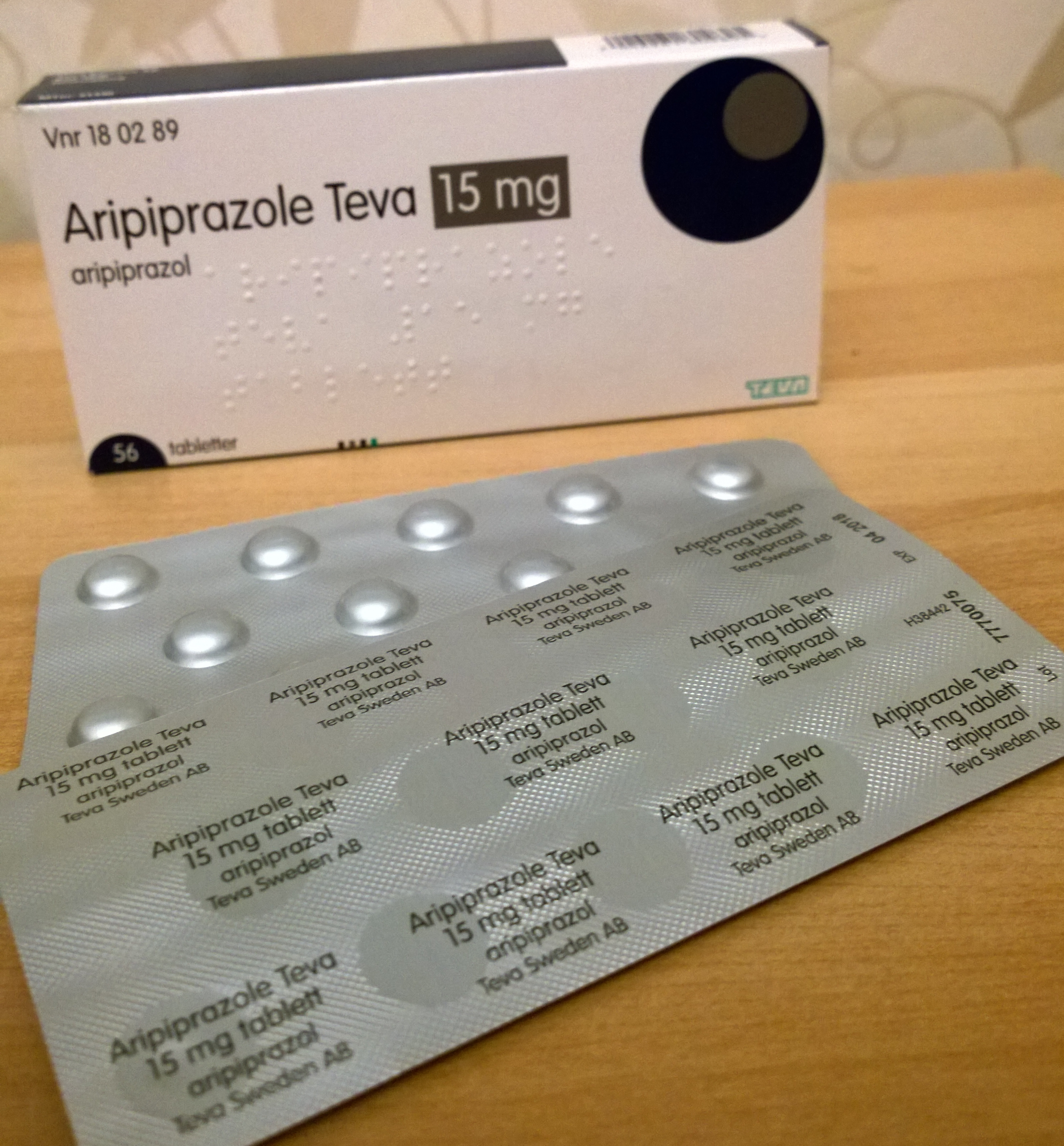
Aripiprazole 15 mg tablets

Aripiprazole, sold under the brand name Abilify, among others, is an atypical antipsychotic primarily used in the treatment of schizophrenia, mania in bipolar disorder, and irritability associated with autism spectrum disorder; other uses include as an add-on treatment for major depressive disorder, obsessive–compulsive disorder, and tic disorders. Aripiprazole is taken by mouth or via injection into a muscle.

It has generally favorable tolerability. Common side effects include restlessness, insomnia, transient weight gain, nausea, vomiting, constipation, dizziness, and mild sedation. Serious side effects may include neuroleptic malignant syndrome, tardive dyskinesia, and anaphylaxis. It is not recommended for older people with dementia-related psychosis due to an increased risk of death. In pregnancy, there is evidence of possible harm to the fetus. It is not recommended in women who are breastfeeding. It has not been very well studied in people younger than 18.

Aripiprazole is a pharmacologically unique atypical antipsychotic whose principal pharmacological action is as a functionally selective partial agonist at dopamine D_{2} receptors, stabilizing dopamine activity by enhancing signaling when levels are low and reducing it when levels are high. It also acts as a partial agonist at dopamine D_{3} and D_{4} receptors and at serotonin 5-HT_{1}A and 5-HT_{2}C receptors. It is a third-generation antipsychotic and its introduction led to a paradigm shift in antipsychotic drug development.

Aripiprazole was discovered in 1988 by Otsuka Pharmaceutical. It received approval for medical use in the United States in 2002 and has since become available as a generic medication. In 2023, it was the 95th most commonly prescribed medication in the U.S., with more than 7 million prescriptions. It is on the World Health Organization's List of Essential Medicines.

== Medical uses ==
Aripiprazole is primarily used for the treatment of schizophrenia or bipolar disorder.

=== Schizophrenia ===
The 2016 National Institute for Health and Care Excellence (NICE) guidance for treating psychosis and schizophrenia in children and young people recommended aripiprazole as a second-line treatment after risperidone for people between 15 and 17 who are having an acute exacerbation or recurrence of psychosis or schizophrenia. A 2014 NICE review of the depot formulation of the drug found that it may have a role in treatment as an alternative to other depot formulations of second-generation antipsychotics for people who have trouble taking medication as directed or who prefer it.

A 2014 Cochrane review comparing aripiprazole and other atypical antipsychotics found it difficult to determine differences as data quality is poor. A 2011 Cochrane review comparing aripiprazole with placebo concluded that high dropout rates in clinical trials, and a lack of outcome data regarding general functioning, behavior, mortality, economic outcomes, or cognitive functioning make it difficult to definitively conclude that aripiprazole is useful in preventing relapse. This review found only low-quality evidence of effectiveness in treating schizophrenia.

A 2013 review placed aripiprazole in the middle range of 15 antipsychotics for effectiveness, approximately as effective as haloperidol and quetiapine and slightly more effective than ziprasidone, chlorpromazine, or asenapine, with better tolerability compared to the other antipsychotic drugs (4th best for reducing weight gain, 5th best for reducing extrapyramidal symptoms, the best for reducing prolactin levels, 2nd best for prolongated QTc interval, and 5th best for sedative symptoms). The authors concluded that for acute psychotic episodes, aripiprazole results in benefits in some aspects of the condition. It lowers prolactin levels. In cases of hyperprolactinaemia caused by other antipsychotics, the addition of or switch to aripiprazole is used to lower prolactin levels.

Aripiprazole is recommended as the initial treatment for schizophrenia according to the INTEGRATE consensus international guidelines.

In 2013 the World Federation of Societies for Biological Psychiatry recommended aripiprazole for treatment of acute exacerbations of schizophrenia as a Grade 1 recommendation and evidence level A.

The British Association for Psychopharmacology similarly recommends that all persons presenting with psychosis receive treatment with an antipsychotic and that such treatment should continue for at least 1–2 years, as "There is no doubt that antipsychotic discontinuation is strongly associated with relapse during this period". The guideline further notes that "Established schizophrenia requires continued maintenance with doses of antipsychotic medication within the recommended range (Evidence level A)".

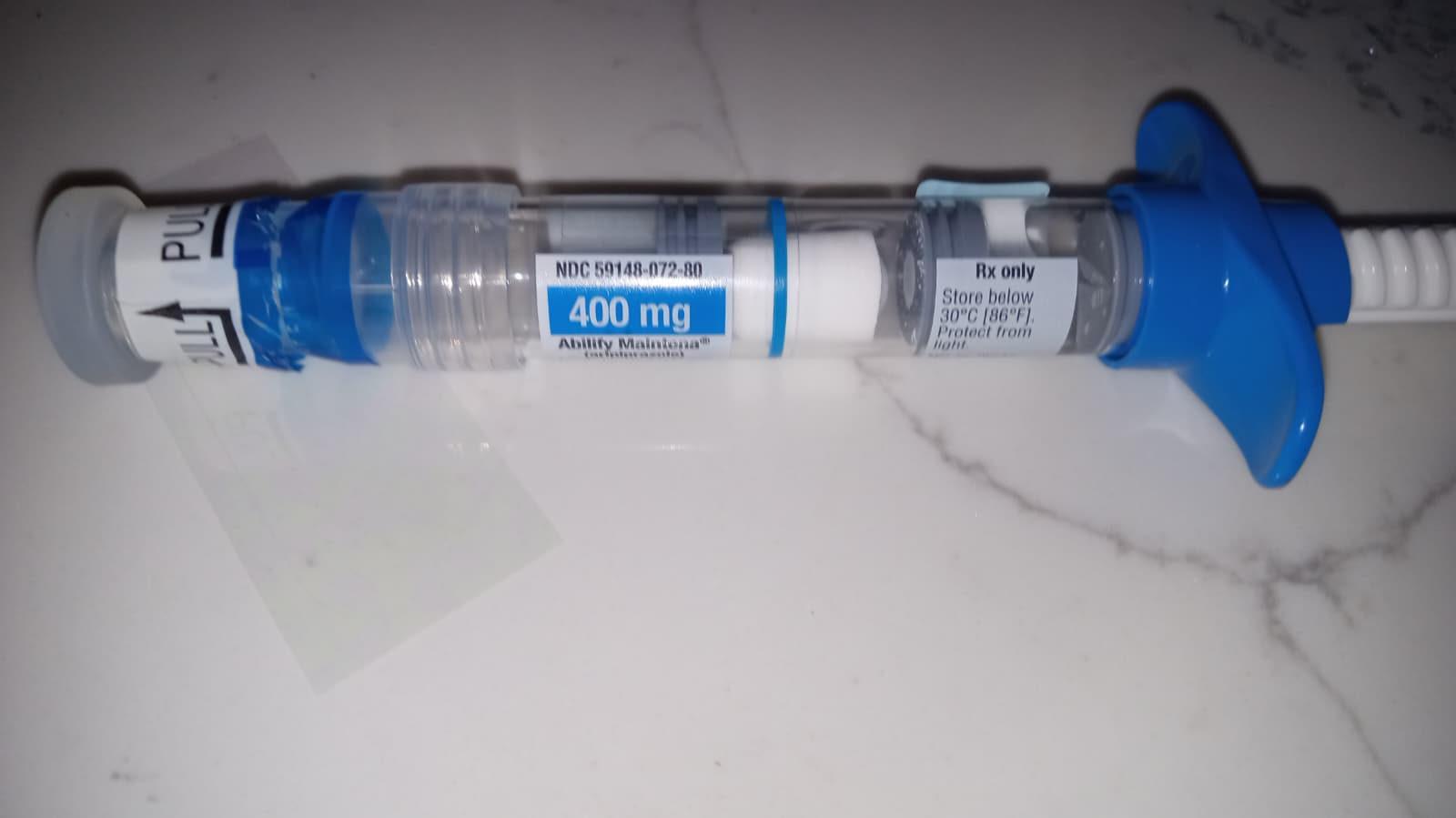
Abilify Maintena 400mg Intramuscular Syringe

The British Association for Psychopharmacology and the World Federation of Societies for Biological Psychiatry suggest there is little difference in effectiveness between antipsychotics in preventing relapse and recommend that the specific antipsychotic be chosen based on each person's preference and side effect profile. The latter group recommends switching to aripiprazole when excessive weight gain is encountered during treatment with other antipsychotics.

=== Bipolar disorder ===
Aripiprazole is effective for the treatment of acute manic episodes of bipolar disorder in adults, children, and adolescents. Used as maintenance therapy, it is useful for the prevention of manic episodes but is not for bipolar depression. Thus, it is often used in combination with an additional mood stabilizer; however, co-administration with a mood stabilizer increases the risk of extrapyramidal side effects. In September 2014, aripiprazole had a UK marketing authorization for up to 12 weeks of treatment for moderate to severe manic episodes in bipolar I disorder in young people aged 13 and older. Aripiprazole in doses of 2.5 mg can cause mania in those with bipolar disorder.

=== Depression ===
Aripiprazole is an effective add-on treatment for major depressive disorder but increases the risk of side effects such as weight gain and movement disorders. The overall benefit is small to moderate and its use appears to improve neither quality of life nor functioning. Aripiprazole may interact with some antidepressants, especially selective serotonin reuptake inhibitors (SSRIs) that are metabolized by CYP2D6. There are known interactions with fluoxetine and paroxetine and lesser interactions with sertraline, escitalopram, citalopram and fluvoxamine. CYP2D6 inhibitors roughly double aripiprazole concentrations, and dosing is adjusted accordingly, i.e., halved. Some people metabolize CYP2D6 more slowly than most, resulting in about 60% more exposure; in poor metabolizers of CYP2D6 also taking CYP3A4 inhibitors, blood concentrations are roughly tripled. When strong CYP2D6 SSRIs (such as fluoxetine and paroxetine) are co-administered, the Food and Drug Administration (FDA) recommends dose monitoring, although it is not clear the SSRI dose should be lowered.

=== Autism ===
Short-term data (eight weeks) shows reduced irritability, hyperactivity, inappropriate speech, and stereotypy, but no change in lethargic behaviors. Adverse effects include weight gain, sleepiness, drooling, and tremors. It is suggested that children and adolescents need to be monitored regularly while taking this medication to evaluate if this treatment option is still effective after long-term use and note if side effects are worsening. Further studies are needed to understand if this drug is helpful for children after long-term use.

=== Tic disorders ===
Aripiprazole is approved for the treatment of Tourette syndrome and other tic disorders. There is evidence supporting that it is effective, safe, and well-tolerated for this use per systematic reviews and meta-analyses.

Developmental stuttering

Off-Label Use and ResearchMechanism: Aripiprazole acts on dopamine pathways, which researchers believe may help regulate the brain circuits involved in speech fluency.Case Reports: Small clinical studies and individual case reports have noted improvements in speech fluency for some adolescents and adults taking specific daily doses (such as 5 mg to 20 mg)

=== Obsessive–compulsive disorder ===
A 2014 systematic review and meta-analysis concluded that add-on therapy with low-dose aripiprazole is an effective treatment for obsessive–compulsive disorder (OCD) that does not improve with selective serotonin reuptake inhibitors (SSRIs) alone. The conclusion was based on the results of two relatively small, short-term trials, each of which demonstrated improvements in symptoms. However, aripiprazole is cautiously recommended by a 2017 review on antipsychotics for OCD. Aripiprazole is not currently approved for the treatment of OCD and is instead used off-label for this indication.

=== Available forms ===
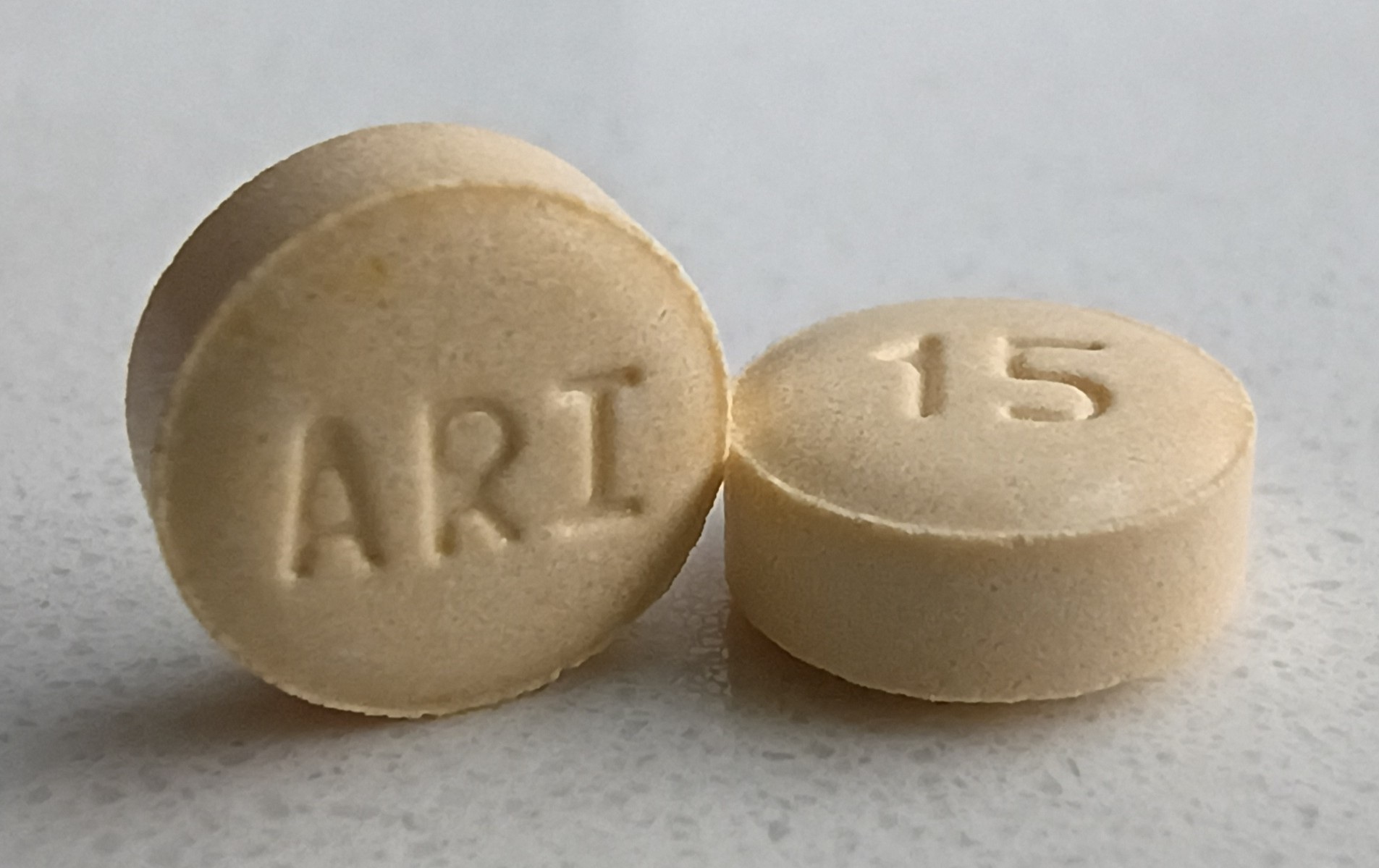
Aripiprazole 15 mg tablets

Aripiprazole is available in the form of oral tablets, oral films, oral disintegrating tablets, oral solution, and digital pills with sensors, and as a short-acting injectable for intramuscular administration. It is also available as a long-acting injectable, aripiprazole lauroxil, a lipophilic ester prodrug of aripiprazole designed to be given once per month, and as a once-every-two-months long-acting injectable, under the brand name Abilify Asimtufii.

== Contraindications ==
Contraindications to aripiprazole include known hypersensitivity to aripiprazole, among others.

== Adverse effects ==
In elderly people with dementia-related psychosis who are treated with antipsychotics, there is an increased risk of death. In children, adolescents, and young adults treated with antidepressants there is an increased risk of suicidal thoughts or behavior.

In adults, side effects with greater than 10% incidence include weight gain, mania, headache, akathisia, insomnia, delirium, gastrointestinal effects like nausea and constipation, and lightheadedness. Side effects in children are similar, and include sleepiness, increased appetite, and stuffy nose.

In 2016, an FDA Drug Safety Communication warned that aripiprazole can rarely cause impulse control issues. The impulse control problems include a strong desire to gamble, binge eat, shop, and engage in sexual activity. These urges can be uncontrollable. The uncontrollable urges were reported to stop when the dose of aripiprazole was lowered or the medication was discontinued.

Uncontrolled movement such as restlessness, tremors, and muscle rigidity may also occur.

=== Discontinuation ===
The British National Formulary recommends gradual withdrawal when discontinuing antipsychotics to avoid acute withdrawal syndrome or rapid relapse. Symptoms of withdrawal commonly include nausea, vomiting, and loss of appetite. Other symptoms may include restlessness, increased sweating, and trouble sleeping. Less commonly there may be a feeling of the world spinning, numbness, or muscle pains. Symptoms generally resolve after a short period of time.

There is tentative evidence that discontinuation of antipsychotics can result in psychosis as a part of a withdrawal syndrome. It may also result in reoccurrence of the condition that is being treated. Rarely tardive dyskinesia can occur when the medication is stopped.

== Overdose ==
Children or adults who ingested acute overdoses have usually manifested central nervous system depression ranging from mild sedation to coma. Serum concentrations of aripiprazole and dehydroaripiprazole, the primary active metabolite of aripiprazole, in these people were up to four times normal therapeutic levels. As of 2008 no deaths had been recorded.

== Interactions ==
Aripiprazole is a substrate of CYP2D6 and CYP3A4. Coadministration with medications that inhibit (e.g., paroxetine, fluoxetine) or induce (e.g., carbamazepine) these metabolic enzymes are known to increase and decrease, respectively, plasma levels of aripiprazole.

Precautions should be taken in people with an established diagnosis of diabetes mellitus who are started on atypical antipsychotics along with other medications that affect blood sugar levels and should be monitored regularly for worsening of glucose control. The liquid form (oral solution) of this medication may contain up to 15 grams of sugar per dose.

Antipsychotics, like aripiprazole, and stimulant medications, such as amphetamine, are traditionally thought to have opposing effects because both drugs affect dopaminergic neurons, but both stimulants and antipsychotics increase synaptic dopamine levels. In antipsychotics, this is caused by the inhibition of dopamine autoreceptors as well as the effects of antipsychotics on non-dopaminergic receptors; in amphetamine this is caused by non-competitive inhibition of dopamine reuptake and agonism of intracellular TAAR1. Therefore, aripiprazole may interact with amphetamine to synergistically increase postsynaptic levels of dopamine. This interaction frequently occurs in the setting of comorbid attention deficit hyperactivity disorder (ADHD, for which stimulants are commonly prescribed) and off-label treatment of aggression with antipsychotics.

Aripiprazole has been reported to provide some benefit in improving cognitive functioning in people with ADHD without other psychiatric comorbidities, though the results have been disputed. The combination of antipsychotics like aripiprazole with stimulants should not be considered an absolute contraindication.

== Pharmacology ==
=== Pharmacodynamics ===
Aripiprazole
Site	K_{i} (nM)	IA (%)	Action	Ref
SERT	900–1260		Reuptake inhibitor	
NET	1340–2840		Reuptake inhibitor	
DAT	2560–3880		Reuptake inhibitor	
5-HT_{1AL}	1.7–6.4	68%	Partial agonist / functional full agonist	
5-HT_{1B}	570–1090		ND	
5-HT_{1D}	57–79		ND	
5-HT_{1E}	3000 – >10,000		ND	
5-HT_{2AL}	6.7–39	0–52%	Partial agonist / functional full agonist	
5-HT_{2B}	0.25–0.47		Inverse agonist	
5-HT_{2CL}	11–197	82%	Partial agonist / functional full agonist	
5-HT_{3}	520–740		ND	
5-HT_{5A}	960–1520	87%	Near-full Agonist	
5-HT_{6}	475–665		Antagonist	
5-HT_{7L}	6.6–14	58%	Partial agonist / functional full agonist	
α_{1A}	25.7		Antagonist	
α_{1B}	35		Antagonist	
α_{2A}	74.3		Antagonist	
α_{2B}	103		ND	
α_{2C}	38		Antagonist	
β_{1}	141		Agonist	
β_{2}	163		Agonist	
D_{1L}	1290–2630		Agonist	
D_{2S}	2.2–4.4	~60%	Partial agonist / functional antagonist	
D_{2L}	0.65–0.83	~58%	Partial agonist / functional full agonist	
D_{3S}	4.3–15.1	~40%	Partial agonist / functional antagonist	
D_{4L}	417–603	~30%	Partial agonist / functional full agonist	
D_{5L}	1240–3940		Agonist	
H_{1}	22.5–27.7		Neutral Antagonist	
H_{2}	>10,000		ND	
H_{3}	60–388		ND	
H_{4}	>10,000		ND	
M_{1}	6,780		ND	
M_{2}	3,510		ND	
M_{3}	4,680		ND	
M_{4}	1,520		ND	
M_{5}	2,330		ND	
GABA_{A}-ρ			Orthosteric; Negative allosteric modulator	
NMDA (PCP1)	1.824		Uncompetitive channel blocker / Antagonist	
NMDA (PCP2)	1.824		Uncompetitive channel blocker / Antagonist	
Values are K_{i} (nM). The smaller the value, the more strongly the drug binds to the site. All data are for human cloned proteins, except 5-HT_{3} (rat), D_{4} (human/rat), H_{3} (guinea pig), and NMDA/PCP (rat). IA = Intrinsic Activity

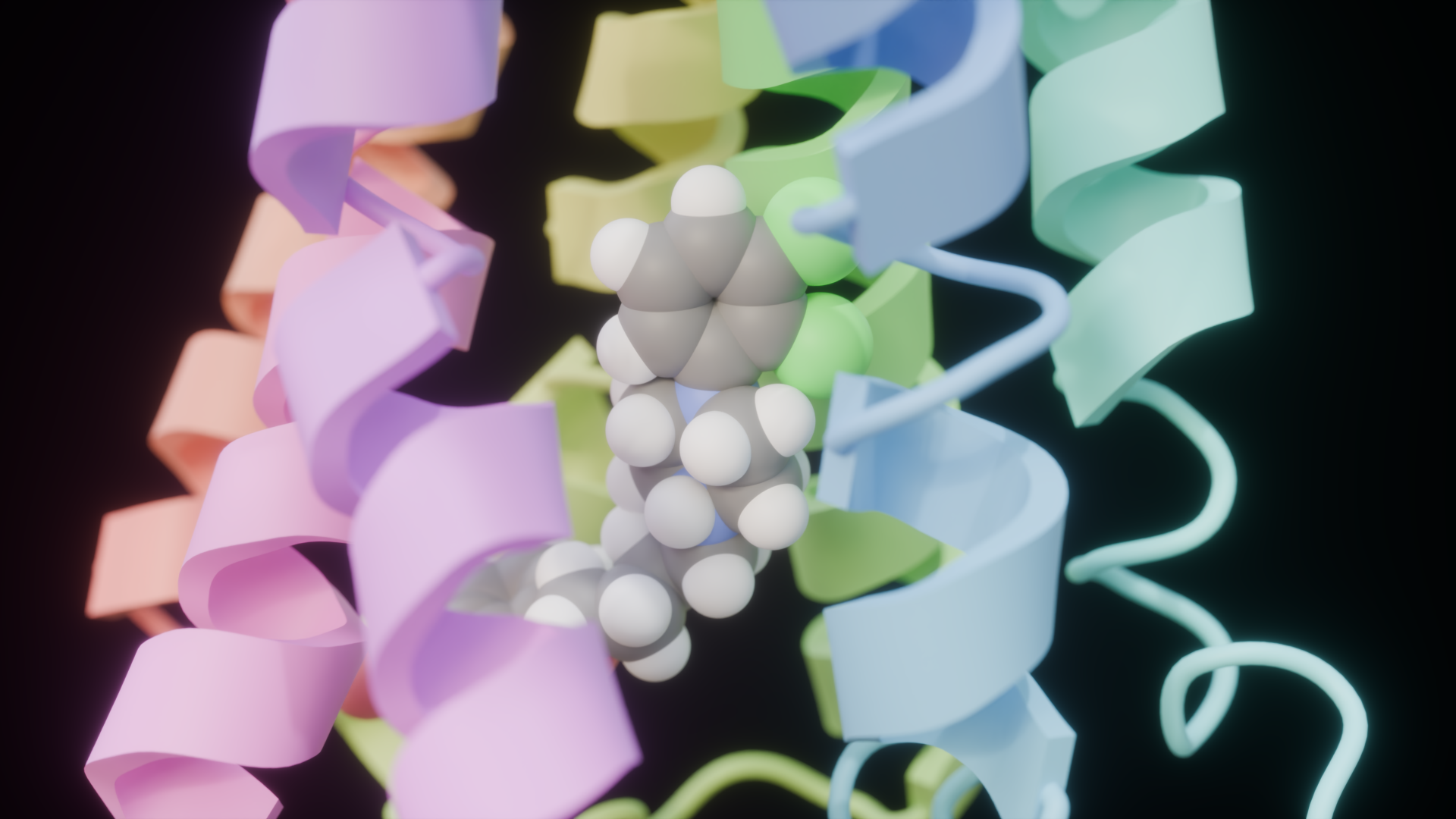
Computational docking model of Aripiprazole bound to human Dopamine D2 receptor.

Aripiprazole's mechanism of action is different from those of the other FDA-approved atypical antipsychotics (e.g., clozapine, olanzapine, quetiapine, ziprasidone, and risperidone). It shows differential engagement at the dopamine receptor (D_{2}) and acts as a partial agonist of this receptor. It is also a partial agonist of the serotonin 5-HT_{1A} receptor. In addition, it is a weak partial agonist of the serotonin 5-HT_{2A}, 5-HT_{2B}, and 5-HT_{2C} receptors.

It appears to show predominantly partial agonistic activity on postsynaptic dopamine D_{2} receptors and partial agonist activity on presynaptic dopamine D_{2} receptors, D_{3}, and partially D_{4} and is a partial activator of serotonin (5-HT_{1A}, 5-HT_{2A}, 5-HT_{2B}, 5-HT_{6}, and 5-HT_{7}). It also shows lower effect on histamine (H_{1}), as well as the serotonin transporter. Aripiprazole acts by modulating neurotransmission overactivity of dopamine, which is thought to mitigate schizophrenia symptoms.

As a pharmacologically unique antipsychotic with pronounced functional selectivity, characterization of this dopamine D_{2} partial agonist (with an intrinsic activity of ~50%) as being similar to a full agonist but at a reduced level of activity presents a misleading oversimplification of its actions; for example, among other effects, aripiprazole has been shown, in vitro, to bind to and/or induce receptor conformations (i.e., facilitate receptor shapes) in such a way as to not only prevent receptor internalization (and, thus, lower receptor density) but even to lower the rate of receptor internalization below that of neurons not in the presence of agonists (including dopamine) or antagonists.

It is often the nature of partial agonists, including aripiprazole, to display a stabilizing effect (such as on mood in this case) with agonistic activity when there are low levels of endogenous neurotransmitters (such as dopamine) and antagonistic activity in the presence of high levels of agonists associated with events such as mania, psychosis, and drug use. In addition to aripiprazole's partial agonism and functional selectivity characteristics, its effectiveness may be mediated by its very high dopamine D_{2} receptor occupancy (approximately 31%, 44%, 75%, 80%, and 95% at daily dosages of 0.5 mg, 2 mg, 10 mg, 30 mg and 40 mg respectively)

Aripiprazole has been characterized as possessing predominantly partial agonist activity on postsynaptic D_{2} receptors and partial agonist activity on presynaptic D_{2} receptors; however, while this explanation intuitively explains the drug's efficacy as an antipsychotic, as the degree of agonism is a function of more than a drug's inherent properties as well as in vitro demonstration of aripiprazole's partial agonism in cells expressing postsynaptic (D_{2L}) receptors, it was noted that "It is unlikely that the differential actions of aripiprazole as an agonist, antagonist, or partial agonist were entirely due to differences in relative D_{2} receptor expression since aripiprazole was an antagonist in cells with the highest level of expression (4.6 pmol/mg) and a partial agonist in cells with an intermediate level of expression (0.5–1 pmol/mg).

Instead, the current data are most parsimoniously explained by the "functional selectivity" hypothesis of Lawler et al. (1999)". Aripiprazole is also a partial agonist of the D_{3} receptor. In healthy human volunteers, D_{2} and D_{3} receptor occupancy levels are high, with average levels ranging between approximately 75% at 2 mg/day to approximately 95% at 40 mg/day. Most atypical antipsychotics bind preferentially to extrastriatal receptors, but aripiprazole appears to be less preferential in this regard, as binding rates are high throughout the brain.

Aripiprazole is also a partial agonist of the postsynaptic serotonin 5-HT_{1A} receptor (intrinsic activity = 68%). a PET scan study of 12 patients receiving doses ranging from 10 to 30 mg found 5-HT_{1A} receptor occupancy to be only 16% compared to ~90% for D_{2}. It is a very weak partial agonist of the Postsynaptic 5-HT_{2A} receptor (intrinsic activity = 12.7%). The drug differs from other atypical antipsychotics in having higher affinity for the D_{2} receptor than for the 5-HT_{2A} receptor. At the 5-HT_{2B} receptor, aripiprazole has both great binding affinity and acts as a potent inverse agonist, "Aripiprazole decreased PI hydrolysis from a basal level of 61% down to a low of 30% at 1000 nM, with an EC_{50} of 11 nM".

Unlike other antipsychotics, aripiprazole is a high-efficacy partial agonist of the postsynaptic 5-HT_{2C} receptor (intrinsic activity = 82%) this property may underlie the minimal weight gain seen in the course of therapy, however if used while taking antidepressants it will become a functional antagonist and increase weight gain. At the presynaptic 5-HT_{7} receptor, aripiprazole is a very weak partial agonist with barely measurable intrinsic activity, and hence is a functional antagonist of this receptor. Aripiprazole also shows lower but likely clinically insignificant affinity for a number of other sites such as the serotonin transporter, while it has negligible affinity for the muscarinic acetylcholine receptors

Since the actions of aripiprazole differ markedly across receptor systems aripiprazole was sometimes an antagonist (e.g., at 5-HT_{6}), sometimes an inverse agonist (e.g., 5-HT_{2B}), sometimes a partial agonist (e.g., D_{2S}, D_{3S}, D_{4S}, D_{2L}). Aripiprazole was frequently found to be a partial agonist or full agonist, with an intrinsic activity that could be low (5-HT_{2A}, 5-HT_{7}), intermediate (D_{2L,} 5-HT_{1A}), or high (5-HT_{2C}). This mixture of agonist actions at D2-dopamine receptors is consistent with the hypothesis that aripiprazole has "functionally selective" actions.

The "functional-selectivity" hypothesis proposes that a mixture of agonist/partial agonist/antagonist actions are likely. According to this hypothesis, agonists may induce structural changes in receptor conformations that are differentially "sensed" by the local complement of G proteins to induce a variety of functional actions depending upon the precise cellular milieu. The diverse actions of aripiprazole at D_{2}-dopamine receptors are clearly cell-type specific (e.g., agonism, antagonism, partial agonism), and are most parsimoniously explained by the "functional selectivity" hypothesis.

Since 5-HT_{2C} receptors have been implicated in the control of depression, obsessive–compulsive disorder (OCD), and appetite, postsynaptic partial agonism at the 5-HT_{2C} receptor might be associated with therapeutic potential in obsessive–compulsive disorder, obesity, and depression. 5-HT_{2C} agonism has been demonstrated to induce anorexia via enhancement of serotonergic neurotransmission via activation of postsynaptic 5-HT_{2C} receptors; it is conceivable that the 5-HT_{2C} partial agonist actions of aripiprazole may, thus, be partly responsible for the minimal weight gain associated with this compound in clinical trials.

In terms of potential action as an antiobsessional agent, it is worthwhile noting that a variety of 5-HT_{2A}/5-HT_{2C} agonists have shown promise as antiobsessional agents, yet many of these compounds are hallucinogenic. Aripiprazole has a favorable pharmacological profile in being a 5-HT_{2C} partial agonist. Based on this profile, one can predict that aripiprazole may have antiobsessional and anorectic actions in humans.

Wood and Reavill's (2007) review of published and unpublished data proposed that, at therapeutically relevant doses, aripiprazole may act essentially as a selective partial agonist of the D_{2} receptor without significantly affecting the majority of serotonin receptors. A positron emission tomography imaging study found that 10 to 30 mg/day aripiprazole resulted in 85 to 95% occupancy of the D_{2} receptor in various brain areas (putamen, caudate, ventral striatum) versus 54 to 60% occupancy of the 5-HT_{2A} receptor and only 16% occupancy of the 5-HT_{1A} receptor. It has been suggested that the low occupancy of the 5-HT_{1A} receptor by aripiprazole may have been an erroneous measurement however.

Aripiprazole acts by modulating neurotransmission overactivity on the dopaminergic mesolimbic pathway, which is thought to be a cause of positive schizophrenia symptoms. Due to its partial agonist activity on D_{2L} receptors, aripiprazole may also increase dopaminergic activity to optimal levels in the mesocortical pathways where it is reduced.

It has also been identified as a potent vesicular monoamine transporter 2 (VMAT2) inhibitor, lessening the degree of tardive dyskinesia, in contrast to other antipsychotic therapy associated with this side effect. (IC_{50} = 36 nM).

=== Pharmacokinetics ===
Aripiprazole displays linear kinetics and has an elimination half-life of approximately 75 hours. Steady-state plasma concentrations are achieved in about 14 days. C_{max} (maximum plasma concentration) is achieved 3–5 hours after oral dosing. Bioavailability of the oral tablets is about 90% and the drug undergoes extensive hepatic metabolization (dehydrogenation, hydroxylation, and N-dealkylation), principally by the enzymes CYP2D6 and CYP3A4. Its only known active metabolite is dehydro-aripiprazole, which typically accumulates to approximately 40% of the aripiprazole concentration. The parenteral drug is excreted only in traces, and its metabolites, active or not, are excreted via feces and urine.

Pharmacokinetics of long-acting injectable antipsychotics
Medication	Brand name	Class	Vehicle	Dosage	T_{max}	t_{1/2} single	t_{1/2} multiple	logP^{c}	Ref
Aripiprazole lauroxil	Aristada	Atypical	Water^{a}	441–1064 mg/4–8 weeks	24–35 days	?	54–57 days	7.9–10.0	
Aripiprazole monohydrate	Abilify Maintena	Atypical	Water^{a}	300–400 mg/4 weeks	7 days	?	30–47 days	4.9–5.2	
Bromperidol decanoate	Impromen Decanoas	Typical	Sesame oil	40–300 mg/4 weeks	3–9 days	?	21–25 days	7.9	
Clopentixol decanoate	Sordinol Depot	Typical	Viscoleo^{b}	50–600 mg/1–4 weeks	4–7 days	?	19 days	9.0	
Flupentixol decanoate	Depixol	Typical	Viscoleo^{b}	10–200 mg/2–4 weeks	4–10 days	8 days	17 days	7.2–9.2	
Fluphenazine decanoate	Prolixin Decanoate	Typical	Sesame oil	12.5–100 mg/2–5 weeks	1–2 days	1–10 days	14–100 days	7.2–9.0	
Fluphenazine enanthate	Prolixin Enanthate	Typical	Sesame oil	12.5–100 mg/1–4 weeks	2–3 days	4 days	?	6.4–7.4	
Fluspirilene	Imap, Redeptin	Typical	Water^{a}	2–12 mg/1 week	1–8 days	7 days	?	5.2–5.8	
Haloperidol decanoate	Haldol Decanoate	Typical	Sesame oil	20–400 mg/2–4 weeks	3–9 days	18–21 days		7.2–7.9	
Olanzapine pamoate	Zyprexa Relprevv	Atypical	Water^{a}	150–405 mg/2–4 weeks	7 days	?	30 days	–	
Oxyprothepin decanoate	Meclopin	Typical	?	?	?	?	?	8.5–8.7	
Paliperidone palmitate	Invega Sustenna	Atypical	Water^{a}	39–819 mg/4–12 weeks	13–33 days	25–139 days	?	8.1–10.1	
Perphenazine decanoate	Trilafon Dekanoat	Typical	Sesame oil	50–200 mg/2–4 weeks	?	?	27 days	8.9	
Perphenazine enanthate	Trilafon Enanthate	Typical	Sesame oil	25–200 mg/2 weeks	2–3 days	?	4–7 days	6.4–7.2	
Pipotiazine palmitate	Piportil Longum	Typical	Viscoleo^{b}	25–400 mg/4 weeks	9–10 days	?	14–21 days	8.5–11.6	
Pipotiazine undecylenate	Piportil Medium	Typical	Sesame oil	100–200 mg/2 weeks	?	?	?	8.4	
Risperidone	Risperdal Consta	Atypical	Microspheres	12.5–75 mg/2 weeks	21 days	?	3–6 days	–	
Zuclopentixol acetate	Clopixol Acuphase	Typical	Viscoleo^{b}	50–200 mg/1–3 days	1–2 days	1–2 days		4.7–4.9	
Zuclopentixol decanoate	Clopixol Depot	Typical	Viscoleo^{b}	50–800 mg/2–4 weeks	4–9 days	?	11–21 days	7.5–9.0	
Note: All by intramuscular injection. Footnotes: ^{a} = Microcrystalline or nanocrystalline aqueous suspension. ^{b} = Low-viscosity vegetable oil (specifically fractionated coconut oil with medium-chain triglycerides). ^{c} = Predicted, from PubChem and DrugBank. Sources: Main: See template.

== Chemistry ==
Aripiprazole belongs to the chemical class of drugs called 2,3-dichlorophenylpiperazines and is chemically related to cariprazine, nefazodone, etoperidone, and trazodone. It is unusual in having twelve known crystalline polymorphs. Analogues of aripiprazole with higher-efficacy serotonin 5-HT_{2A} receptor partial agonism and with psychedelic- and antidepressant-like effects have been developed.

=== Synthesis ===
Multiple syntheses of aripiprazole have been reported. A procedure using ethanol as the solvent is shown below. Tetrahydroquinoline derivative 2 undergoes an S_{N}2 reaction with dihalide 1 to give ether 3. This undergoes a further S_{N}2 reaction with piperazine derivative 4 giving ariprazole.

Flow synthesis of aripiprazole.

== History ==
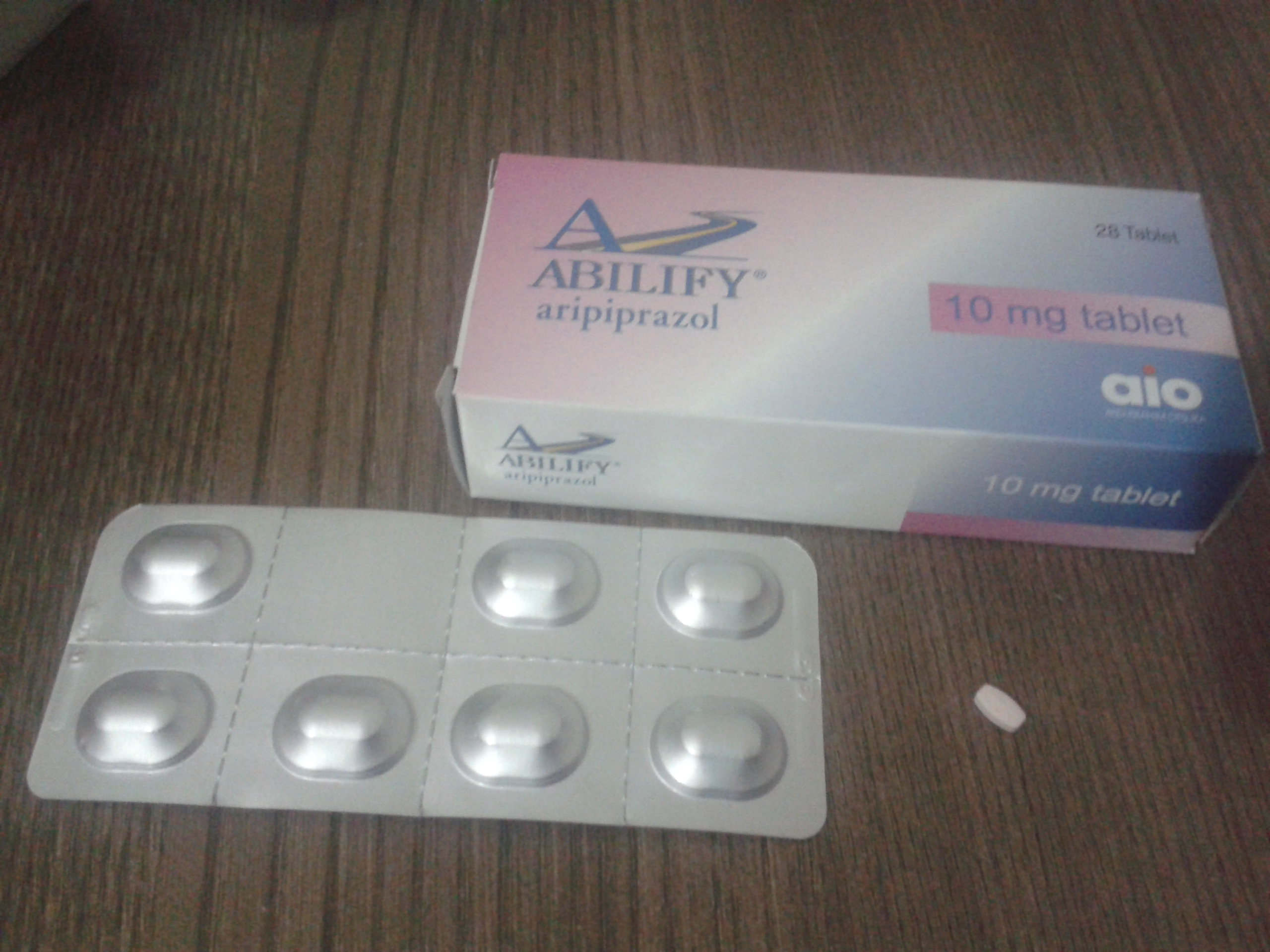
Abilify (aripiprazole) 10 mg tablets (TR)

Aripiprazole was discovered in 1988 by scientists at the Japanese firm Otsuka Pharmaceutical and was called OPC-14597. It was first published in 1995. Otsuka initially developed the drug, and partnered with Bristol-Myers Squibb (BMS) in 1999 to complete development, obtain approvals, and market aripiprazole.

It was approved by the US Food and Drug Administration (FDA) for schizophrenia in November 2002, and by the European Medicines Agency in June 2004; for acute manic and mixed episodes associated with bipolar disorder on 1 October 2004; as an adjunct for major depressive disorder on 20 November 2007; and to treat irritability in children with autism on 20 November 2009. Likewise it was approved for use as a treatment for schizophrenia by the Therapeutic Goods Administration (TGA) of Australia in May 2003.

Aripiprazole has been approved by the FDA for the treatment of both acute manic and mixed episodes, in people older than ten years.

In 2006, the FDA required manufacturers to add a black box warning to the label, warning that older people who were given the drug for dementia-related psychosis were at greater risk of death.

In 2007, aripiprazole was approved by the FDA for the treatment of unipolar depression when used adjunctively with an antidepressant medication. That same year, BMS settled a case with the US government in which it paid $515 million; the case covered several drugs but the focus was on BMS's off-label marketing of aripiprazole for children and older people with dementia.

In 2011 Otsuka and Lundbeck signed a collaboration to develop a depot formulation of aripiprazole.

As of 2013, Abilify had annual sales of US$7 billion. In 2013 BMS returned marketing rights to Otsuka, but kept manufacturing the drug. Also in 2013, Otsuka and Lundbeck received US and European marketing approval for an injectable depot formulation of aripiprazole.

Otsuka's US patent on aripiprazole expired on 20 October 2014, but due to a pediatric extension, a generic did not become available until 20 April 2015. Barr Laboratories (now Teva Pharmaceuticals) initiated a patent challenge under the Hatch-Waxman Act in March 2007. On 15 November 2010, this challenge was rejected by the U.S. District Court in New Jersey.

Otsuka's European patent EP0367141 which would have expired on 26 October 2009, was extended by a Supplementary Protection Certificate (SPC) to 26 October 2014., The UK Intellectual Property Office decided on 4 March 2015 that the SPC could not be further extended by six months under Regulation (EC) No 1901/2006. Even if the decision is successfully appealed, protection in Europe will not extend beyond 26 April 2015.

From April 2013 to March 2014, sales of Abilify amounted to almost $6.9 billion.

In April 2015, the FDA announced the first generic versions. In October 2015, aripiprazole lauroxil, a prodrug of aripiprazole that is administered via intramuscular injection once every four to six weeks for the treatment of schizophrenia, was approved by the FDA.

In 2016, BMS settled cases with 42 US states that had charged BMS with off-label marketing to older people with dementia; BMS agreed to pay $19.5 million.

In November 2017, the FDA approved Abilify Mycite, a digital pill containing a sensor intended to record when its consumer takes their medication.

A long-acting injectable version of aripiprazole was approved by the FDA for the treatment of bipolar disorder 1 and schizophrenia in April 2023.

In 2024, the European Commission approved the 2 month long-acting injectable formulation of aripiprazole for the maintenance treatment of schizophrenia. This came after the 1 month long-acting injectable formulation lost drug exclusivity status in the US and Europe (the market is now open to generics).

== Society and culture ==
=== Legal status ===
Regulatory administration (country)	Schizophrenia	Acute mania	Bipolar maintenance	Major depressive disorder (as an adjunct)	Irritability in autism
Food and Drug Administration (US)	Yes	Yes	Yes (as an adjunct to lithium/valproate)	Yes	Yes (children and adolescents)
Therapeutic Goods Administration (AU)	Yes	Yes (as an adjunct to lithium/valproate)	Yes	No	No
Medicines and Healthcare products Regulatory Agency (UK)	Yes	Yes	Yes (to prevent mania)	No	No
European Medicines Agency (EU)	Yes	No	Yes	No	No

=== Classification ===
Aripiprazole has been described as the prototypical third-generation antipsychotic, as opposed to first-generation (typical) antipsychotics like haloperidol and second-generation (atypical) antipsychotics like clozapine. It has received this classification due to its partial agonism of dopamine receptors, and is the first of its kind in this regard among antipsychotics, which before aripiprazole acted only as dopamine receptor antagonists. The introduction of aripiprazole has led to a paradigm shift from a dopamine antagonist-based approach to a dopamine agonist-based approach for antipsychotic drug development.

=== Brand names ===
Brand names of aripiprazole include Abilify, Aristada (as aripiprazole lauroxil), Arip MT, Explemed, Arivitae, Opipza, and Mezofy, among others.

=== Involuntary administration ===
In 2024, Capital Daily and the Investigative Journalism Foundation published an investigation into Kirsten "Kir" Anvik, a 54-year-old single mother in Victoria, British Columbia, who had been involuntarily detained under British Columbia's Mental Health Act since 2016 and forced to receive monthly depot injections of aripiprazole (as Abilify Maintena). Anvik reported debilitating side effects including nerve pain, muscle stiffness, and loss of balance, as well as a compulsive spending episode she attributed to the drug. Under British Columbia's "deemed consent" model — unique among Canadian provinces — involuntarily certified patients are not required to give consent to psychiatric treatment, and physicians are not required to consult a substitute decision-maker. The article noted that at least 1,684 suspected serious adverse reactions to Abilify and Abilify Maintena had been reported to Health Canada since 2014. The constitutional validity of British Columbia's deemed consent provisions was the subject of an ongoing challenge before the British Columbia Supreme Court under the Canadian Charter of Rights and Freedoms.

== Research ==
=== Attention deficit hyperactivity disorder ===
Aripiprazole was under development for the treatment of attention-deficit hyperactivity disorder (ADHD), but development for this indication was discontinued. A 2017 meta review found only preliminary evidence (studies with small sample sizes and methodological problems) for aripiprazole in the treatment of ADHD. A 2013 systematic review of aripiprazole for ADHD similarly reported that there is insufficient evidence of effectiveness to support aripiprazole as a treatment for the condition. Although all six non-controlled open-label studies in the review reported effectiveness, two small randomized controlled trials found that aripiprazole did not significantly decrease ADHD symptoms. A high rate of adverse effects with aripiprazole such as weight gain, sedation, and headache was noted. Most research on aripiprazole for ADHD is in children and adolescents. Evidence on aripiprazole specifically for adult ADHD appears to be limited to a single case report.

=== Substance dependence ===
Aripiprazole has been studied for the treatment of amphetamine dependence and other substance use disorders, but more research is needed to support aripiprazole for these potential uses. Available evidence of aripiprazole for amphetamine dependence is mixed. Some studies have reported attenuation of the effects of amphetamines by aripiprazole, whereas other studies have reported both enhancement of the effects of amphetamines and increased use of amphetamines by aripiprazole. As such, aripiprazole may not only be ineffective but potentially harmful for treatment of amphetamine dependence, and caution is warranted with regard to its use for such purposes.
