= Remote dispensing =

Use of automated system in health care

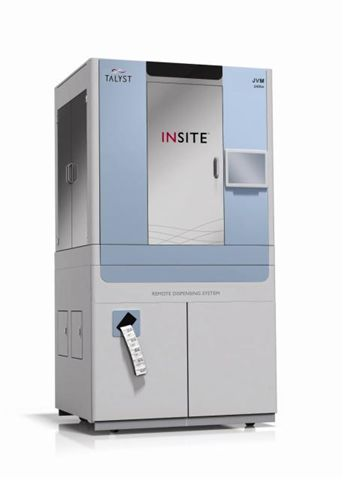
An example of a remote-dispensing unit used in long-term care facilities and correctional institutions

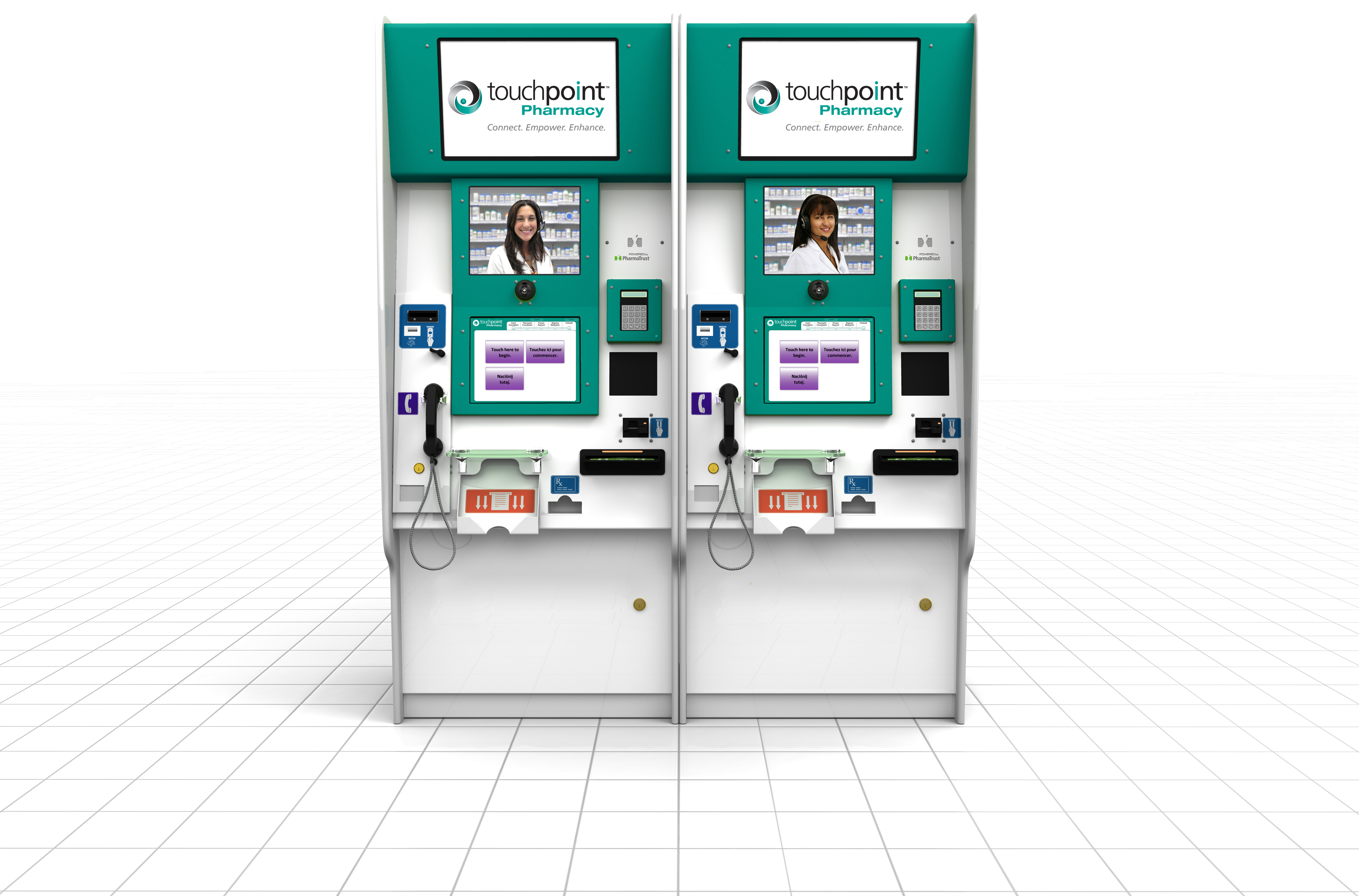
An example of a remote dispensing pharmacy used at healthcare facilities, University campuses, and Aboriginal communities in Canada.

Remote dispensing is used in health care environments to describe the use of automated systems to dispense (package and label) prescription medications without an on-site pharmacist. This practice is most common in long-term care facilities and correctional institutions that do not find it practical to operate a full-service in-house pharmacy.

Remote dispensing can also be used to describe the pharmacist controlled remote prescription dispensing units which connect patients to a remotely located pharmacist over video interface to receive counseling and medication dispensing. Because these units are pharmacist controlled, the units can be located outside of typical healthcare settings such as employer sites, universities and remote locations, thus offering pharmacy services where they have previously never existed before.

== A typical remote-dispensing system ==
A typical remote-dispensing system is monitored remotely by a central pharmacy and includes secure, automated medication dispensing hardware that is capable of producing patient-specific packages of medications on demand. The secure medication dispensing unit is placed on-site at the care facility or non-healthcare locations (such as universities, workplaces and retail locations) and filled with pharmacist-checked medication canisters.

When patient medications are needed, the orders are submitted to a pharmacist at the central pharmacy, the pharmacist reviews the orders and, when approved, the medications are subsequently dispensed from the on-site dispensing unit at the remote care facility. Medications come out of the dispensing machine printed with the patient’s name, medication name, and other relevant information.

If the medication stock in a canister is low, the central pharmacy is alerted to fill a canister from their bulk stock. New canisters are filled, checked by the pharmacist, security sealed, and delivered to the remote care facility.

== Perceived advantages ==
In theory, access to dispensing services 24 hours a day in locations previously unable to support full pharmacy operations. Advocates for remote dispensing additionally claim that the service provides focused, uninterrupted and personalized time with a pharmacist as the system manages the physical dispensing process while the pharmacist simply oversees it. Certain prescription dispensing units can carry over 2000 different medications tailored to the prescribing habits of local healthcare providers. Furthermore, remote dispensing terminal manufacturers state that this technology can facilitate patient continuity of care between prescriber and pharmacist.

== Disadvantages ==
While some may purport that travel time to pharmacies is reduced, this point has been negated by an Ontarian study published in the journal Healthcare Policy as over 90% of Ontarians live within a 5 km radius of a pharmacy.

Remote dispensing also places a physical barrier between the patient and pharmacist, limiting the pharmacist's ability to detect a patient's nonverbal cues. A patient with alcohol on his or her breath would go undetected via remote dispensing, increasing the risk for dangerous interactions with drugs such as tranquilizers, sleeping pills, narcotics, and warfarin to name a few. This problem may be amplified through telecommunication service disruptions, which were reported in previous studies examining the utility of remote dispensing technology.

Remote dispensing has the potential to undermine the services offered by physically present pharmacists. Hands-on patient training on inhalers and glucose meters is not feasible with remote dispensing, and administration of injections is impossible without a physically present pharmacist. Other cognitive services such as in-depth medication consultations are also impractical to conduct over such audiovisual technology, which do not provide acoustic privacy for the patient, nor do they meet mandatory criteria for conducting such services that require an “in-person discussion” to occur. Furthermore, the variety of drugs offered by remote dispensing is limited in comparison to traditional pharmacies, which in the province of Ontario are required to maintain a dispensary of at least 9.3 m^{2} in area, far greater than that of any remote dispensing machine.

== See also ==
- Telepharmacy
- Telemedicine
