= The Lancet Digital Health =

Peer-reviewed digital health journal

The Lancet Digital health
- Discipline: Digital health
- Language: English
- Edited by: Hugh Thomas

Publication details
- History: 2019–present
- Publisher: Elsevier (United Kingdom)
- Frequency: Monthly
- Impact factor: 25.5 (2025)
- ISO 4: Find out here

Indexing
- ISSN: 2589-7500
- OCLC no.: 1103228733

Links
- Journal homepage; Online access; Webpage at publisher's site

The Lancet Digital Health is an open-access, peer-reviewed monthly journal dedicated to the rapidly evolving field of digital health. The journal addresses the intersection of technology and health, focusing on how digital tools can inform and improve clinical practices and outcomes worldwide.

== History ==
The journal started in 2019 with the first issue published in May of that year. As of 2026, Hugh Thomas is the editor-in-chief of the journal. The editorial team also includes deputy editor Diana Samuel and senior editor Lucy Dunbar. The journal is a subsidiary journal in The Lancet family.

== Scope ==
The journal addresses both the potential and the challenges of digital health, including issues of patient privacy, regulatory needs, and safety. By fostering interdisciplinary dialogue and engaging a global community of researchers, clinicians, and policymakers, The Lancet Digital Health is a resource for shaping the integration of technology in health care.

== See also ==
- The Lancet
- npj Digital Medicine
