= Investigative Journalism Foundation =

Canadian organization

- Formation: January 4, 2023; 3 years ago
- Type: Non-profit
- Headquarters: Toronto
- Location: Canada
- CEO and editor-in-chief: Zane Schwartz
- Staff: 12 (2023)
- Volunteers: 80
- Website: theijf.org

The Investigative Journalism Foundation (IJF) is a Canadian not-for-profit organization that creates publicly accessible databases about philanthropic donations, political funding, and lobbying in Canada.

IJF also operates a newsroom. Its editorial team publishes investigative reports on political and public policy-related donations in the country. The Investigative Journalism Foundation was described as "Canada's ProPublica" by the Neiman Lab's Sarah Scire.

== Organization ==
The Investigative Journalism Foundation is a Canadian not-for-profit organization that was launched on January 4, 2023. The organization is supported by donations from the Balsillie Family Foundation, the Trottier Family Foundation, the McConnell Foundation, the Social Sciences and Humanities Research Council, the University of Toronto Scarborough, and John Campbell & Denise Fujiwara. The organization is based in Toronto.

It is led by CEO and editor-in-chief Zane Schwartz. The board of directors includes Brent Jolly, (the President of the Canadian Association of Journalists), Karyn Pugliese (the Editor-in-Chief of Canada’s National Observer), Sadia Zaman (the CEO of the Inspirit Foundation), and John Ruffolo, (the founder of Maverix Private Equity). Reporters include Roberto Rocha and Kayla Zhu, contributing editors include Fatima Syed and Michael Pereira. There are 12 staff in total, eight of whom are full-time.

== Databases and investigative reporting ==
The Investigative Journalism Foundation's team, which includes over eighty volunteers and academic partners, spent two years gathering and analyzing data from government websites and organizing them into eight publicly accessible databases on topics including political funding, philanthropic donations, and lobbying. The Investigative Journalism Foundation has raised roughly $800,000 Canadian dollars since 2021 from 10 donors.

In addition to creating and managing these databases, the Foundation uses them to develop investigative reporting in collaboration with news outlets including Canada's National Observer, Village Media, The Walrus and The Canadian Press. It published eight stories on the day of its launch, including a piece with The Walrus about the state of Canadian public housing and one investigating various lobbyists' presence at fundraisers for the Prime Minister.

In September 2026, workers at IJF voted to unionize, filing to join the Canadian Media Guild as members.

== See also ==
- Institute for Nonprofit News (member)
