= Patient adherence =

Descriptor of patient compliance with medical advice

In medicine, patient adherence describes the degree to which a person correctly follows medical advice. Most commonly, it refers to medication or drug compliance, but it can also apply to other situations such as medical device use, self care, self-directed exercises, therapy sessions, or medical follow-up visits. Patient compliance and patient adherence may be used interchangeably but adherence emphasizes the role of the patient in decision-making and factors that influence the ability to follow instructions. Concordance is the process by which a patient and clinician make decisions together about treatment. Differences in terminology reflect regional variation, deliberate distinctions, and the preferences of various groups and organizations.

Both patient and health-care provider affect adherence, and a positive physician-patient relationship is the most important factor in improving compliance. Access to care plays a role in patient adherence, whereby greater wait times to access care contributing to greater absenteeism. The cost of prescription medication and potential side effects also play a role.

Worldwide, non-compliance is a major obstacle to the effective delivery of health care. 2003 estimates from the World Health Organization indicated that only about 50% of patients with chronic diseases living in developed countries follow treatment recommendations with particularly low rates of adherence to therapies for asthma, diabetes, and hypertension. Major barriers to compliance are thought to include the complexity of modern medication regimens, poor health literacy and not understanding treatment benefits, the occurrence of undiscussed side effects, poor treatment satisfaction, cost of prescription medicine, and poor communication or lack of trust between a patient and his or her health-care provider. Efforts to improve compliance have been aimed at simplifying medication packaging, providing effective medication reminders, improving patient education, and limiting the number of medications prescribed simultaneously. Studies show a great variation in terms of characteristics and effects of interventions to improve medicine adherence. It is still unclear how adherence can consistently be improved in order to promote clinically important effects.

== Terminology ==
In medicine, compliance describes the degree to which a patient correctly follows medical advice. Most commonly, it refers to medication or drug compliance, but it can also apply to medical device use, self care, self-directed exercises, or therapy sessions. Both patient and health-care provider affect compliance, and a positive physician-patient relationship is the most important factor in improving compliance.

As of 2003, US health care professionals more commonly used the term "adherence" to a regimen rather than "compliance", because it has been thought to reflect better the diverse reasons for patients not following treatment directions in part or in full. Additionally, the term adherence includes the ability of the patient to take medications as prescribed by their physician with regards to the correct drug, dose, route, timing, and frequency. It has been noted that compliance may only refer to passively following orders. The term adherence is often used to imply a collaborative approach to decision-making and treatment between a patient and clinician.

The term concordance has been used in the United Kingdom to involve a patient in the treatment process to improve compliance, and refers to a 2003 NHS initiative. In this context, the patient is informed about their condition and treatment options, involved in the decision as to which course of action to take, and partially responsible for monitoring and reporting back to the team. Informed intentional non-adherence is when the patient, after understanding the risks and benefits, chooses not to take the treatment.

As of 2005, the preferred terminology remained a matter of debate. As of 2007, concordance has been used to refer specifically to patient adherence to a treatment regimen which the physician sets up collaboratively with the patient, to differentiate it from adherence to a physician-only prescribed treatment regimen. Despite the ongoing debate, adherence has been the preferred term for the World Health Organization, The American Pharmacists Association, and the U.S. National Institutes of Health Adherence Research Network. The Medical Subject Headings of the United States National Library of Medicine defines various terms with the words adherence and compliance. Patient Compliance and Medication Adherence are distinguished under the MeSH tree of Treatment Adherence and Compliance.

== Adherence factors ==
In 2003 WHO estimated that half of those for whom long term treatment regimens are prescribed do not follow them as directed. In general, adherence is higher in diseases where people see a greater health threat, such as HIV/AIDS and cancer, and it is lower for chronic conditions such as hypertension, asthma or diabetes.

Factors can be categorized on 3 levels: individual, cultural and healthcare system level.

=== Individual factors ===
Depressive symptoms and perceived discrimination have been correlated with poor adherence.

=== Side effects ===
Negative side effects of a medicine can influence adherence.

=== Socioeconomic status ===
Medication adherence rates are typically lower with lower socioeconomic status, increased stress related to difficult life circumstances.

Poverty is associated with Low levels of literacy and numeracy. Adults in more deprived areas, such as the North East of England, performed at a lower level than those in less deprived areas such as the South East. Local authority tenants and those in poor health were particularly likely to lack basic skills.

=== Literacy ===
In 1999 one fifth of UK adults, nearly seven million people, had problems with basic skills, especially functional literacy and functional numeracy, described as: "The ability to read, write and speak in English, and to use mathematics at a level necessary to function at work and in society in general." This made it impossible for them to effectively take medication, read labels, follow drug regimes, and find out more.

In 2003, 20% of adults in the UK had a long-standing illness or disability and a national study for the UK Department of Health, found more than one-third of people with poor or very poor health had literary skills of Entry Level 3 or below.

A study of the relationship of literacy to asthma knowledge revealed that only 31% of asthma patients with a reading level of a ten-year-old knew they needed to see the doctors, even when they were not having an asthma attack, compared to 90% with a high school graduate reading level.

=== Treatment cost ===
In 2013 the US National Community Pharmacists Association sampled for one month 1,020 Americans above age 40 for with an ongoing prescription to take medication for a chronic condition and gave a grade C+ on adherence. In 2009, this contributed to an estimated cost of $290 billion annually. In 2012, increase in patient medication cost share was found to be associated with low adherence to medication.

The United States is among the countries with the highest prices of prescription drugs mainly attributed to the government's lack of negotiating lower prices with monopolies in the pharmaceutical industry especially with brand name drugs. In order to manage medication costs, many US patients on long term therapies fail to fill their prescription, skip or reduce doses. According to a Kaiser Family Foundation survey in 2015, about three quarters (73%) of the public think drug prices are unreasonable and blame pharmaceutical companies for setting prices so high. In the same report, half of the public reported that they are taking prescription drugs and a "quarter (25%) of those currently taking prescription medicine report they or a family member have not filled a prescription in the past 12 months due to cost, and 18 percent report cutting pills in half or skipping doses". In a 2009 comparison to Canada, only 8% of adults reported to have skipped their doses or not filling their prescriptions due to the cost of their prescribed medications.

=== Health literacy ===
Cost and poor understanding of the directions for the treatment, referred to as 'health literacy' have been known to be major barriers to treatment adherence. Misinformation from the internet and social media can also lead to a delay or lack of compliance in following medical advice.

=== Age ===
The recent National Service Framework on the care of older people highlighted the importance of taking and effectively managing medicines in the elderly. Elderly individuals may face challenges, including multiple medications with frequent dosing, and potentially decreased dexterity or cognitive functioning. Patient knowledge is also a factor.

In 1999 Cline et al. identified several gaps in knowledge about medication in elderly patients discharged from hospital. Despite receiving written and verbal information, 27% of older people discharged after heart failure were classed as non-adherent within 30 days. Half the patients surveyed could not recall the dose of the medication that they were prescribed and nearly two-thirds did not know what time of day to take them. A 2001 study by Barat et al. evaluated the medical knowledge and factors of adherence in a population of 75-year-olds living at home. They found that 40% of elderly patients do not know the purpose of their regimen and only 20% knew the consequences of non-adherence. Comprehension, polypharmacy, living arrangement, multiple doctors, and use of compliance aids was correlated with adherence.

In children with asthma, self-management compliance is critical and co-morbidities have been noted to affect outcomes; in 2013 it has been suggested that electronic monitoring may help adherence.

=== Ethnicity ===
People of different ethnic backgrounds have unique adherence issues through, for example, limited English language proficiency, their cultural belief system rooted in historical experience (Tuskegee experiment), resulting in medical mistrust. There are few published studies on adherence in medicine taking in ethnic minority communities. Ethnicity and culture influence some health-determining behaviour, such as participation in health screening programmes and attendance at follow-up appointments.

Ethnic groups differ in their attitudes, values, culture and beliefs about health and illness, particularly with preventive treatments and medication for asymptomatic conditions. Additionally, some cultures fatalistically attribute their good or poor health to their god(s), and attach less importance to self-care than others. Complementary and alternative medicine may be taken with or instead of the prescribed medications especially in Mexican American and Vietnamese people.

Studies have shown that black patients and those with non-private insurance are more likely to be labeled as non-adherent. An increased risk for non adherence was observed even after controlling for A1c, and socioeconomic factors.

=== Prescription fill rates ===
Not all patients will fill the prescription at a pharmacy. In a 2010 U.S. study, 20–30% of prescriptions were never filled at the pharmacy. Reasons people do not fill prescriptions include the cost of the medication, A US nationwide survey of 1,010 adults in 2001 found that 22% chose not to fill prescriptions because of the price, which is similar to the 20–30% overall rate of unfilled prescriptions. Other factors are doubting the need for medication, or preference for self-care measures other than medication. Convenience, side effects and lack of demonstrated benefit are also factors.

==== Medication Possession Ratio ====
Prescription medical claims records can be used to estimate medication adherence based on fill rate. Patients can be routinely defined as being 'Adherent Patients' if the amount of medication furnished is at least 80% based on days' supply of medication divided by the number of days patient should be consuming the medication. This percentage is called the medication possession ratio (MPR). 2013 work has suggested that a medication possession ratio of 90% or above may be a better threshold for deeming consumption as 'Adherent'.

Two forms of MPR can be calculated, fixed and variable. Calculating either is relatively straightforward, for Variable MPR (VMPR) it is calculated as the number of days' supply divided by the number of elapsed days including the last prescription.

$VMPR = \dfrac{\text{All days' supply}}{\text{Elapsed days (inclusive of last prescription)}}$

For the Fixed MPR (FMPR) the calculation is similar but the denominator is the number of days in a year whilst the numerator is constrained to be the number of days' supply within the year that the patient has been prescribed.

$FMPR = \dfrac{\text{All days' supply} \le 365}{365}$

For medication in tablet form it is relatively straightforward to calculate the number of days' supply based on a prescription. Some medications are less straightforward though because a prescription of a given number of doses may have a variable number of days' supply because the number of doses to be taken per day varies, for example with preventative corticosteroid inhalers prescribed for asthma where the number of inhalations to be taken daily may vary between individuals based on the severity of the disease.

=== Contextual factors ===
Contextual factors along with intrapersonal circumstances such as mental states affect decisions. They can accurately predict decisions where most contextual information is identified. General compliance with recommendations to follow isolation is influenced beliefs such as taking health precaution to be protected against infection, perceived vulnerability, getting COVID-19 and trust in the government. Mobility reduction, compliance with quarantine regulations in European regions where level of trust in policymakers is high can influence whether one complies with isolation rules. In addition, perceived infectiousness of COVID-19 is a strong predictor of rule compliance such that the more contagious people think COVID-19 is, the less willing social distancing measures are taken, while the sense of duty and fear of the virus contribute to staying at home. People might not leave their homes due to trusting regulations to be effective or placing it in a higher power such that individuals who trust others demonstrate more compliance than those who do not. Compliant individuals see protective measures as effective, while non-compliant people see them as problematic.

=== Course completion ===
Once started, patients seldom follow treatment regimens as directed, and seldom complete the course of treatment. In respect of hypertension, 50% of patients completely drop out of care within a year of diagnosis. Persistence with first-line single antihypertensive drugs is extremely low during the first year of treatment. As far as lipid-lowering treatment is concerned, only one third of patients are compliant with at least 90% of their treatment. Intensification of patient care interventions (e.g. electronic reminders, pharmacist-led interventions, healthcare professional education of patients) improves patient adherence rates to lipid-lowering medicines, as well as total cholesterol and LDL-cholesterol levels.

The World Health Organization (WHO) estimated in 2003 that only 50% of people complete long-term therapy for chronic illnesses as they were prescribed, which puts patient health at risk. For example, in 2002 statin compliance dropped to between 25 and 40% after two years of treatment, with patients taking statins for what they perceive to be preventative reasons being unusually poor compliers.

A wide variety of packaging approaches have been proposed to help patients complete prescribed treatments. These approaches include formats that increase the ease of remembering the dosage regimen as well as different labels for increasing patient understanding of directions. For example, medications are sometimes packed with reminder systems for the day and/or time of the week to take the medicine. Some evidence shows that reminder packaging may improve clinical outcomes such as blood pressure.

A not-for-profit organisation called the Healthcare Compliance Packaging Council of Europe] (HCPC-Europe) was set up between the pharmaceutical industry, the packaging industry with representatives of European patients organisations. The mission of HCPC-Europe is to assist and to educate the healthcare sector in the improvement of patient compliance through the use of packaging solutions. A variety of packaging solutions have been developed by this collaboration.

== World Health Organization Barriers to Adherence ==
The World Health Organization (WHO) groups barriers to medication adherence into five categories; health care team and system-related factors, social and economic factors, condition-related factors, therapy-related factors, and patient-related factors. Common barriers include:

Barrier	Category
Poor Patient-provider Relationship	Health Care Team and System
Inadequate Access to Health Services	Health Care Team and System
High Medication Cost	Social and Economic
Cultural Beliefs	Social and Economic
Level of Symptom Severity	Condition
Availability of Effective Treatments	Condition
Immediacy of Beneficial Effects	Therapy
Side Effects	Therapy
Stigma Surrounding Disease	Patient
Inadequate Knowledge of Treatment	Patient

== Improving adherence rates ==
=== Role of health care providers ===
Health care providers play a great role in improving adherence issues. Providers can improve patient interactions through motivational interviewing and active listening. Health care providers should work with patients to devise a plan that is meaningful for the patient's needs. A relationship that offers trust, cooperation, and mutual responsibility can greatly improve the connection between provider and patient for a positive impact. The wording that health care professionals take when sharing health advice may have an impact on adherence and health behaviours, however, further research is needed to understand if positive framing (e.g., the chance of surviving is improved if you go for screening) versus negative framing (e.g., the chance of dying is higher if you do not go for screening) is more effective for specific conditions.

=== Technology ===
In 2012 it was predicted that as telemedicine technology improves, physicians will have better capabilities to remotely monitor patients in real-time and to communicate recommendations and medication adjustments using personal mobile devices, such as smartphones, rather than waiting until the next office visit.

Medication Event Monitoring Systems (MEMS), as in the form of smart medicine bottle tops, smart pharmacy vials or smart blister packages as used in clinical trials and other applications where exact compliance data are required, work without any patient input, and record the time and date the bottle or vial was accessed, or the medication removed from a blister package. The data can be read via proprietary readers, or NFC enabled devices, such as smartphones or tablets. A 2009 study stated that such devices can help improve adherence. More recently a 2016 scoping review suggested that in comparison to MEMS, median mediction adherence was grossly overestimated by 17% using self-report, by 8% using pill count and by 6% using rating as alternative methods for measuring medication adherence.

The effectiveness of two-way email communication between health care professionals and their patients has not been adequately assessed.

==== Mobile phones ====
As of 2019, 5.15 billion people, which equates to 67% of the global population, have a mobile device and this number is growing. Mobile phones have been used in healthcare and has fostered its own term, mHealth. They have also played a role in improving adherence to medication. For example, text messaging has been used to remind patients to take medication in patients with chronic conditions such as asthma and hypertension. Other examples include the use of smartphones for synchronous and asynchronous Video Observed Therapy (VOT) as a replacement for the currently resource intensive standard of Directly Observed Therapy (DOT) (recommended by the WHO) for Tuberculosis management. Other mHealth interventions for improving adherence to medication include smartphone applications, voice recognition in interactive phone calls and Telepharmacy. Some results show that the use of mHealth improves adherence to medication and is cost-effective, though some reviews report mixed results. Studies show that using mHealth to improve adherence to medication is feasible and accepted by patients. Specific mobile applications might also support adherence. mHealth interventions have also been used alongside other telehealth interventions such as wearable wireless pill sensors, smart pillboxes and smart inhalers

=== Forms of medication ===
Depot injections need to be taken less regularly than other forms of medication and a medical professional is involved in the administration of drugs so can increase compliance. Depot's are used for oral contraceptive pill and antipsychotic medication used to treat schizophrenia and bipolar disorder.

=== Coercion ===
Sometimes drugs are given involuntarily to ensure compliance. This can occur if an individual has been involuntarily committed or are subjected to an outpatient commitment order, where failure to take medication will result in detention and involuntary administration of treatment. This can also occur if a patient is not deemed to have mental capacity to consent to treatment in an informed way.

== Health and disease management ==
A WHO study estimates that only 50% of patients with chronic diseases in developed countries follow treatment recommendations.

Asthma non-compliance (28–70% worldwide) increases the risk of severe asthma attacks requiring preventable ER visits and hospitalisations; compliance issues with asthma can be caused by a variety of reasons including: difficult inhaler use, side effects of medications, and cost of the treatment.

=== Cancer ===
200,000 new cases of cancer are diagnosed each year in the UK. One in three adults in the UK will develop cancer that can be life-threatening, and 120,000 people will be killed by their cancer each year. This accounts for 25% of all deaths in the UK. However while 90% of cancer pain can be effectively treated, only 40% of patients adhere to their medicines due to poor understanding.

Results of a recent (2016) systematic review found a large proportion of patients struggle to take their oral antineoplastic medications as prescribed. This presents opportunities and challenges for patient education, reviewing and documenting treatment plans, and patient monitoring, especially with the increase in patient cancer treatments at home.

The reasons for non-adherence have been given by patients as follows:

- The poor quality of information available to them about their treatment
- A lack of knowledge as to how to raise concerns whilst on medication
- Concerns about unwanted effects
- Issues about remembering to take medication

Partridge et al (2002) identified evidence to show that adherence rates in cancer treatment are variable, and sometimes surprisingly poor. The following table is a summary of their findings:

Type of Cancer	Measure of non-Adherence	Definition of non-Adherence	Rate of Non-Adherence
Haematological malignancies	Serum levels of drug metabolites	Serum levels below expected threshold	83%
Breast cancer	Self-report	Taking less than 90% of prescribed medicine	47%
Leukemia or non Hodgkin's lymphoma	Level of drug metabolite in urine	Level lower than expected	33%
Leukemia, Hodgkin's disease, non Hodgkin's	Self-report and parent report	More than one missed dose per month	35%
Lymphoma, other malignancies	Serum bioassay	Not described	
Hodgkin's disease, acute lymphocytic leukemia (ALL)	Biological markers	Level lower than expected	50%
ALL	Level of drug metabolite in urine	Level lower than expected	42%
ALL	Level of drug metabolites in blood	Level lower than expected	10%
ALL	Level of drug metabolites in blood	Level lower than expected	2%

- Medication event monitoring system - a medication dispenser containing a microchip that records when the container is opened and from Partridge et al (2002)

In 1998, trials evaluating Tamoxifen as a preventative agent have shown dropout rates of around one-third:

- 36% in the Royal Marsden Tamoxifen Chemoprevention Study of 1998
- 29% in the National Surgical Adjuvant Breast and Bowel Project of 1998

In March 1999, the "Adherence in the International Breast Cancer Intervention Study" evaluating the effect of a daily dose of Tamoxifen for five years in at-risk women aged 35–70 years was

- 90% after one year
- 83% after two years
- 74% after four years

=== Diabetes ===
Patients with diabetes are at high risk of developing coronary heart disease and usually have related conditions that make their treatment regimens even more complex, such as hypertension, obesity and depression which are also characterised by poor rates of adherence.

- Diabetes non-compliance is 98% in US and the principal cause of complications related to diabetes including nerve damage and kidney failure.
- Among patients with Type 2 Diabetes, adherence was found in less than one third of those prescribed sulphonylureas and/or metformin. Patients taking both drugs achieve only 13% adherence.

Other aspects that drive medicine adherence rates is the idea of perceived self-efficacy and risk assessment in managing diabetes symptoms and decision making surrounding rigorous medication regiments. Perceived control and self-efficacy not only significantly correlate with each other, but also with diabetes distress psychological symptoms and have been directly related to better medication adherence outcomes. Various external factors also impact diabetic patients' self-management behaviors including health-related knowledge/beliefs, problem-solving skills, and self-regulatory skills, which all impact perceived control over diabetic symptoms.

Additionally, it is crucial to understand the decision-making processes that drive diabetics in their choices surrounding risks of not adhering to their medication. While patient decision aids (PtDAs), sets of tools used to help individuals engage with their clinicians in making decisions about their healthcare options, have been useful in decreasing decisional conflict, improving transfer of diabetes treatment knowledge, and achieving greater risk perception for disease complications, their efficacy in medication adherence has been less substantial. Therefore, the risk perception and decision-making processes surrounding diabetes medication adherence are multi-faceted and complex with socioeconomic implications as well. For example, immigrant health disparities in diabetic outcomes have been associated with a lower risk perception amongst foreign-born adults in the United States compared to their native-born counterparts, which leads to fewer protective lifestyle and treatment changes crucial for combatting diabetes. Additionally, variations in patients' perceptions of time (i.e. taking rigorous, costly medication in the present for abstract beneficial future outcomes can conflict with patients' preferences for immediate versus delayed gratification) may also present severe consequences for adherence as diabetes medication often requires systematic, routine administration.

=== Hypertension ===
- Hypertension non-compliance (93% in US, 70% in UK) is the main cause of uncontrolled hypertension-associated heart attack and stroke.
- In 1975, only about 50% took at least 80% of their prescribed anti-hypertensive medications.

As a result of poor compliance, 75% of patients with a diagnosis of hypertension do not achieve optimum blood-pressure control.

=== Mental illness ===
A 2003 review found that 41–59% of patients prescribed antipsychotics took the medication prescribed to them infrequently or not at all. Sometimes non-adherence is due to lack of insight, but psychotic disorders can be episodic and antipsychotics are then used prophylactically to reduce the likelihood of relapse rather than treat symptoms and in some cases individuals will have no further episodes despite not using antipsychotics. A 2006 review investigated the effects of compliance therapy for schizophrenia: and found no clear evidence to suggest that compliance therapy was beneficial for people with schizophrenia and related syndromes.

=== Rheumatoid arthritis ===
A longitudinal study has shown that adherence with treatment about 60%. The predictors of adherence were found to be more of psychological, communication and logistic nature rather than sociodemographic or clinical factors. The following factors were identified as independent predictors of adherence:

- the type of treatment prescribed
- agreement on treatment
- having received information on treatment adaptation
- clinician perception of patient trust

== See also ==
- Drug withdrawal
- Patient participation
