= Npj Digital Medicine =

Peer-reviewed medical journal

npj Digital Medicine
- Discipline: Digital medicine
- Language: English
- Edited by: Joseph C. Kvedar

Publication details
- History: Since 2018
- Publisher: Nature Portfolio
- Frequency: Continuous
- Open access: Yes
- License: Creative Commons Attribution
- Impact factor: 18.0 (2025)

Standard abbreviations
- ISO 4: npj Digit. Med.

Indexing
- ISSN: 2398-6352
- LCCN: 2018243291
- OCLC no.: 1015973865

Links
- Journal homepage; Online archive

npj Digital Medicine is a peer-reviewed open-access medical journal covering all aspects of digital medicine. The journal was established in 2018 and is published by Springer Nature in partnership with Seoul National University Bundang Hospital. The editor-in-chief is Joseph C. Kvedar (Harvard Medical School). The journal publishes research articles, brief communications, comments, editorials, and reviews.

== Abstracting and indexing ==
The journal is abstracted and indexed in:

- CINAHL
- Current Contents/Clinical Medicine
- Embase
- Inspec
- Science Citation Index Expanded
- Scopus

According to the Journal Citation Reports, the journal has a 2025 impact factor of 18.0.
