= Telepharmacy =

Pharmacy care by telecommunication

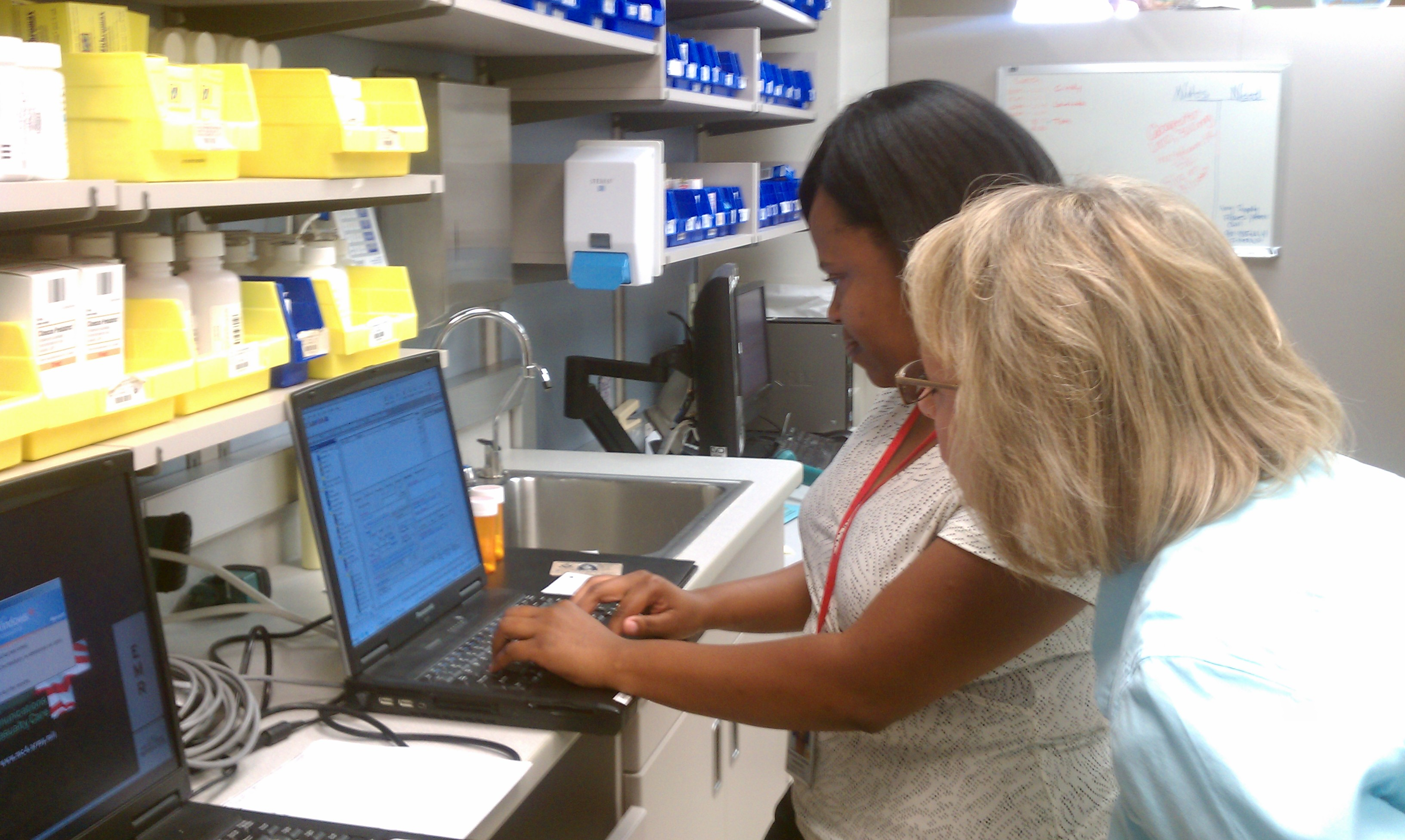
Pharmacy personnel deliver medical prescriptions electronically; remote delivery of prescription drugs is a feature of telepharmacy.

Telepharmacy is the delivery of pharmaceutical care via telecommunications to patients in locations where they may not have direct contact with a pharmacist. It is an instance of the wider phenomenon of telemedicine, as implemented in the field of pharmacy. Telepharmacy services include drug therapy monitoring, patient counseling, prior authorization and refill authorization for prescription drugs, and monitoring of formulary compliance with the aid of teleconferencing or videoconferencing. Remote dispensing of medications by automated packaging and labeling systems can also be thought of as an instance of telepharmacy. Telepharmacy services can be delivered at retail pharmacy sites or through hospitals, nursing homes, or other medical care facilities.

The term can also refer to the use of videoconferencing in pharmacy for other purposes, such as providing education, training, and management services to pharmacists and pharmacy staff remotely.

== Benefits and drawbacks ==
A primary appeal of telepharmacy is its potential to expand access to pharmacy care in smaller rural communities, some of which cannot support a full-time pharmacist or cannot easily recruit a pharmacist to reside in their region. Telepharmacy can potentially give patients in remote locations access to professional pharmacy care that could not be received locally, which can lower costs and improve patient safety through better patient counseling, drug administration monitoring, and compliance monitoring. Sharing of pharmacists between sites can also decrease costs in existing facilities, which might no longer need to employ a full-time pharmacist.

The potential costs of telepharmacy are broadly the same as those associated with all forms of telemedicine: potentially decreased human interaction between medical professionals and patients, an increased risk of error when medical services are delivered in the absence of a registered professional, and an increased risk that protected health information may be compromised through electronic information storage and transmission.

One concern is whether medication adherence is affected by the use of telepharmacy. One retrospective cohort study that examined the dispensing records of a low-income Chicago neighborhood showed that medication adherence was lower among users of telepharmacy than users of a traditional pharmacy in some but not all drug classes examined.

== Implementation ==
The implementation of telepharmacy varies by region and jurisdiction. Factors including geography, laws and regulations, and economics influence its implementation.

=== Australia ===
A form of telepharmacy has been in use by Australia's Royal Flying Doctor Service since 1942. Medical chests containing medications and equipment are placed in remote communities where they can be administered to patients during a telehealth consultation. Some 3,500 chests were distributed around Australia as of 2006. In one year, Queensland recorded 21,470 telehealth consultations, of which 13.7% resulted in administration of a medication from a medical chest. The medication types administered most often are antibiotics, analgesics and gastrointestinal medications. This system improves access to both emergency and routine medical care in remote parts of Australia and reduces the need for patients to travel to seek medical care.

Another application of telepharmacy in Queensland has been the provision of pharmaceutical reviews in rural hospitals that lack on-staff pharmacists. Although broader use of telepharmacy could help alleviate a shortage of pharmacists, Australia has lagged the United States in its implementation of telepharmacy, partly because doctors, nurses, and other health care workers provide pharmacy services in rural and remote areas where there are no pharmacists.

=== United States ===
Implementation of telepharmacy in the United States began in the 2000s. A combination of factors, including changes in Medicare reimbursement for medications and the recession of 2007–8, led to a decline in the number of independent pharmacies in rural areas. In response to the need for alternative means of delivering pharmacy in services in rural communities lacking a full-time pharmacist, several midwestern and northwestern states with extensive rural areas have led much of the development of policy and implementation methods for telepharmacy.

In 2001, North Dakota became the first U.S. state to pass regulations allowing retail pharmacies to operate without requiring a pharmacist to be physically present. The next year, state agencies and grants established the North Dakota Telepharmacy Project, which now supports more than fifty remote retail and hospital pharmacy sites throughout North Dakota. In this program, a licensed pharmacist at a central site communicates with remote site pharmacy technicians and patients through videoconferencing. A 2004 study of the program found that telepharmacy delivered the same quality of pharmacy services as traditional facilities, and a study of the operation of one North Dakota telepharmacy business from 2002 through 2004 found that, while medication inventory turnover was lower than the industry average, the remote sites were able to be operated profitably. The success and expansion of this program were an inspiration and model for programs and laws in other states.

The Community Health Association of Spokane, a network of community health centers in Spokane, Washington, started a telepharmacy program in 2001. The program delivers remote medication dispensing and health counseling to patients at six urban and rural clinics; remote site personnel are connected to pharmacists at the base site by videoconferencing. A survey found that most patients at the remote sites strongly agreed or agreed that they would have had difficulty affording their medications without this program.

The Alaska Native Medical Center, a hospital in Anchorage, Alaska, providing telehealth services to Alaska Native populations, established a telepharmacy program in 2003 to improve its pharmaceutical services in rural native settlements. The American Society of Health-System Pharmacists gave the program its 2006 Award for Excellence in Medication-Use Safety, concluding that the use of telepharmacy had improved access to pharmaceutical care and enabled pharmacists to monitor medication safety and encourage medication adherence, as well as making pharmacy care more cost-effective.

The U.S. Navy Bureau of Medicine operates a large-scale telepharmacy program for the use of service personnel. After piloting the program in 2006 at Naval Hospital Pensacola in Florida and Naval Hospital Bremerton in Washington, in 2010 the Navy expanded it to more sites throughout the world. This program represents the largest implementation of telepharmacy to date.

California passed a Telehealth Advancement Act in 2011 to update the state's legal definitions of telehealth, simplify approval processes for telehealth services, and broaden the range of medical services that may be provided via telehealth. The law establishes legal parity between the direct and remote delivery of pharmacy care. Iowa's first telepharmacy opened in September 2012 after receiving a three-year waiver from the Iowa Board of Pharmacy that allows the facility to operate without a pharmacist on-site.

A 2010 study of the various American states' rural health offices found that telepharmacy in rural medical facilities varied in prevalence across the United States but was still not widespread, and that many states had not yet clearly defined regulations for telepharmacy in hospitals. Adoption and implementation of telepharmacy methods has been slow compared to the spread of the basic technologies involved (internet access, audio/video compression algorithms, microphones and video cameras), despite periodic predictions of a forthcoming boom in the industry. Aside from more intangible factors (such as physicians' and pharmacists' personal uneasiness with the lack of physical interaction with patients), the major obstacles to telepharmacy implementation appear to have been the lack of clear legal regulations for telepharmacy, and the lack of network and software systems to manage (and secure) all of the data used in a professional pharmacy. As of 2010, many of the telepharmacy facilities in active operation were operating as pilot programs or under temporary waivers issued by state regulators because many states still had no clear legal framework for the regulation of remote pharmaceutical sites without pharmacists. Even in states that had regulated retail telepharmacy practices, regulations were often not in place to permit the implementation of telepharmacy in hospital settings. For some pharmacy facilities that might otherwise consider telepharmacy, the cost and complexity of the infrastructure needed to manage patient data across multiple sites can be prohibitive. In addition to the computer hardware required for patient data storage, distribution and teleconferencing, telepharmacy programs must deploy network security tools and procedures adequate to protect patient medical information in compliance with HIPAA and other patient privacy regulations. In 2010 the North Dakota Telepharmacy Project estimated that the computer hardware needed for a typical retail installation costs US$17,300 per site, with an additional cost of US$5,000 to buy a mobile cart for a hospital installation.

=== Canada ===
Adoption of telepharmacy in Canada began as a response to a nationwide shortage of pharmacists. Canada's first telepharmacy service was started by a hospital in Cranbrook, British Columbia, in June 2003 in order to assist a hospital in a nearby town that was unable to hire a pharmacist. To meet the need for service, a hospital pharmacist in Cranbrook began using telepharmacy technology to oversee pharmacy technicians at the other hospital. A similar service was subsequently extended to other small hospitals in the province; it is also used to provide coverage when a hospital's sole pharmacist is absent due to illness or vacation. Remote dispensing machines for medication began operation in Ontario, Canada, in 2007. After a patient inserts a prescription into the dispensing machine, the prescription is scanned and the patient is connected by telephone videoconference to a pharmacist at a remote site. The pharmacist reviews the prescription, discusses the patient's medication history, and authorizes the machine to dispense medication to the patient. The machines proved successful, with one assessment revealing that 96% of patients using them had their prescription filled in under five minutes. As of 2009, a hospital in Ontario, Canada, was using telepharmacy services in addition to retaining a pharmacist at the hospital; the telepharmacist reviews medication orders, while the on-site pharmacist works with patients and oversees medication safety in the facility. Thus telepharmacy support allows the on-site pharmacist to focus on the more sensitive and nuanced tasks for which physical presence is most helpful.

=== Other countries ===
After their success in Canada, remote medication dispensing machines were scheduled to be tested at several hospital locations in the United Kingdom beginning in 2010. In 2013, Maxor National Pharmacy Services, a U.S. company, reported that its remote dispensing machines for medication were being used in Bahrain, Belgium, Cuba, England, Germany, Guam, Italy, Japan, Spain and Venezuela.

In 2010, Mannings drugstores became the first in Hong Kong to use videoconferencing to allow patients at outlets without full-time pharmacists to consult with pharmacists at other sites. In Malaysia, a health startup called Esyms provides a telepharmacy service that has a live chat and video feature which allows you to speak to a licensed pharmacist.
