= Ruth Kajander =

Canadian psychiatrist (1924–2019)

Ruth Kajander (15 August 1924- 8 November 2019) was a psychiatrist and pioneer in the use of chlorpromazine as a treatment for schizophrenia.

== Early life ==
Ruth Kajander was born Ruth Elisabeth Emilia Auguste Koeppe in Goettingen, Germany in 1924. She was the daughter of Else (née Corman) and Hanskurt Koeppe and had two younger brothers. In her teenage years, during the Second World War, she fled Berlin on bicycle to return to her hometown. In 1948, she completed medical school at Giessen University. In 1957, she married Aatto Arthur Kajander with whom she had one child.

== Career ==
Kajander became the first female intern at the Oshawa General Hospital in 1953. That same year, she learned about the pre-anesthetic chlorpromazine. She realized that the drug sedated patients without putting them to sleep, which opened up the possibility of reducing tension and overactivity in patients with mental illnesses. She administered the drug at the London Psychiatric Hospital in Ontario. This trial involved 25 patients, mostly with symptoms of overactive catatonic schizophrenia. She noted that the drug was effective in improving their quality of life. Although she was the first person in North America to test this drug on psychiatric patients, credit for this contribution went to Heinz Lehmann who was conducting his research around the same time. Kajander presented her findings in November 1953 at the regular meeting of the Ontario Neuropsychiatric Association, months before Lehmann’s first publication. She did not receive formal recognition because her work was not published.

Later in her life, Kajander went on to become the first female president of the Ontario Psychiatric Association in 1982. She was also one of the first women to be involved in the Ontario Medical Association.

== Awards ==
- Order of Canada (2011)
- Order of the Lion, Knight First Class
