= University of Giessen =

Public university in Hesse, Germany

- Justus-Liebig-Universität Gießen
- Type: Public
- Established: 19 May 1607; 419 years ago
- Affiliations: German Academic Exchange Service (DAAD), German Research Council (DFG)
- Rector: Katharina Lorenz
- Total staff: 5,853
- Students: 24,961
- Location: Gießen, Hesse, Germany; 50°34′50″N 8°40′37″E
- Colors: Blue and white
- Website: www.uni-giessen.de
- Location within Germany Location within Hesse

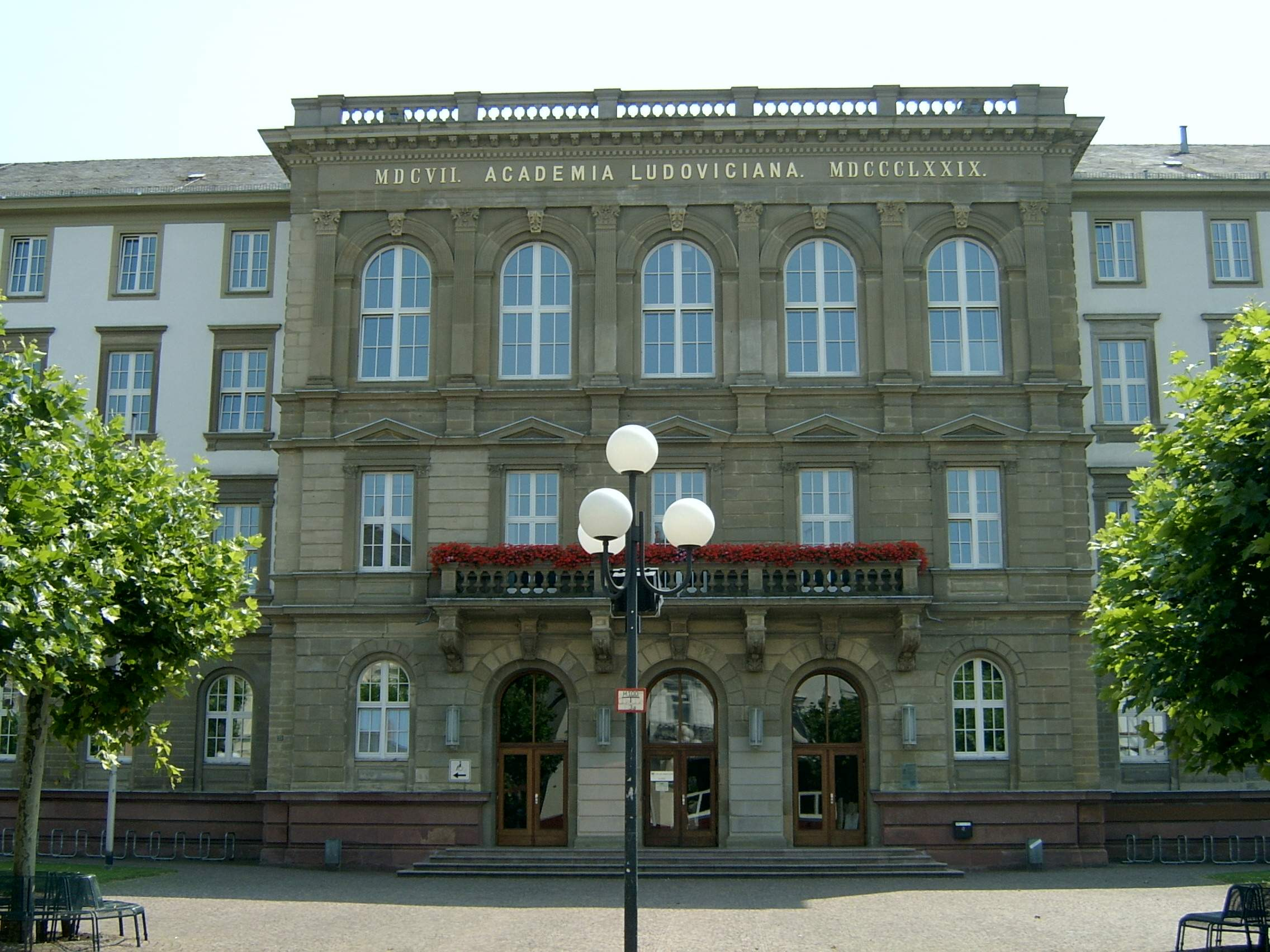
Main building

University of Giessen, official name Justus Liebig University Giessen (German: Justus-Liebig-Universität Gießen), is a large public research university in Giessen, Hesse, Germany. It is one of the oldest institutions of higher education in the German-speaking world. It is named after its most famous faculty member, Justus von Liebig, the founder of modern agricultural chemistry and inventor of artificial fertiliser. It covers the areas of arts/humanities, business, dentistry, economics, law, medicine, science, social sciences and veterinary medicine. Its university hospital, which has two sites, Giessen and Marburg (the latter of which is the teaching hospital of the University of Marburg), is the only private university hospital in Germany.

== History ==
The University of Giessen is among the oldest institutions of higher education in the German-speaking world. It was founded in 1607 as a Lutheran university in the city of Giessen in Hesse-Darmstadt because the all-Hessian Landesuniversität (the nearby University of Marburg (Philipps-Universität Marburg) in Marburg, Hesse-Kassel (or Hesse-Cassel)) had become Reformed (that is, Calvinist). Louis V, Landgrave of Hesse-Darmstadt, whence the university got its original name "Ludoviciana", founded his own institution of higher education in Giessen, which as a Lutheran institution had the primary function of ensuring the education of pastors and civil servants. Endowed with a charter issued by Rudolf II, Holy Roman Emperor, on 19 May 1607, the university was allowed to proceed with instruction in October 1607. During the Thirty Years' War, when Hesse-Darmstadt was able to take the area around Marburg for itself, the University of Giessen ceased instruction and was moved back to its more long-standing location in Marburg (1624/25). The Peace of Westphalia led to the restoration of the old location and in 1650 to the relocation of the university to Giessen.

In the 17th and 18th centuries the Ludoviciana was a typical small state university that then had the four common faculties (theology, law, medicine, and philosophy). The instruction was reasonable, with about 20 to 25 professors teaching several hundred students, the latter of which were mostly "Landeskinder". In the 18th century came gradual modernization of the curricula and reforms in the instruction, which were definitively influenced by the local lordly court in Darmstadt. The example for the reforms were both of the "model universities of the Enlightenment", the University of Halle, founded in 1694, and more still Georgia Augusta, founded in Göttingen in 1734/37. Indeed, all attempts at reform were from the start limited by the limited finances of Hesse-Darmstadt.

The noteworthy creation of a Faculty of Economics (1777–1785) was ultimately born out of this financial hardship. In the Faculty of Economics, new practical subjects were brought together (veterinary medicine, forestry, and cameral sciences), which the university was supposed to make "expedient" and "profitable". (One of the earliest courses of study in forestry in Europe.) After finishing studies in this Faculty, a number of these youths were able to gain recognition in the Faculties of Medicine and Philosophy. They established the unusually diverse course offerings that continue to exist to the modern day at the University of Giessen.

The University of Giessen weathered the transition from the 18th to the 19th century unscathed and was still the only university of an enlarged territory, the Grand Duchy of Hesse. Alongside Jena, Giessen was the prototype for the politicized Vormärz university, and the "Giessener Schwarzen" with Karl Follen and Georg Büchner, marked the revolutionary spirit of this decade. With the appointment of the 21-year-old Justus von Liebig in 1824 through the Grand Duchy—against the will of the university on the recommendation of Alexander von Humboldt—a new era in the natural sciences began, not only in Giessen. Young, promising scientists created a new impulse in their respective areas of knowledge; among these scientists were the antiquarian Friedrich Gottlieb Welcker, the lawyer Rudolf von Jhering, the theologian Adolf von Harnack, the mathematician Moritz Pasch and the physicist Wilhelm Conrad Röntgen.

At the turn of the 20th century, the Ludoviciana began to expand into a modern university. During this period, new clinics in human and veterinary medicine were established, and the university library received its first proper building. With the creation of the university's central building (inaugurated 1880) and the adjacent newly constructed facilities for chemistry and physics a new cultural centre was established on what was then the border of the city. The decisive backer of this project was the last Grand Duke Ernst Ludwig, to whom the university bestowed out of thankfulness the honorary title of "Rector Magnificentissimus". In 1902 the student body surpassed one thousand. For the first time included in the student body were women, who since 1900 were admitted as guest students and starting in 1908 were admitted for regular study.

After the different Hessian states were (re-)united in 1929, both universities became public universities of that German state. The University of Giessen now has almost 25,000 students and 5,853 employees, which together with the Giessen students of Technische Hochschule Mittelhessen, makes Giessen the most student-dominated German city.

In December 2019 the university shut down all of its IT-servers after a "serious IT security incident". Hess State Prosecution Office investigated the case of a suspected hacker-attack.

== Faculties and departments ==
- Faculty 01 – Law
- Faculty 02 – Economics and Business Studies
- Faculty 03 – Social Sciences and Cultural Studies
- Faculty 04 – History and Cultural Studies
- Faculty 05 – Language, Literature, Culture
- Faculty 06 – Psychology and Sports Science
- Faculty 07 – Mathematics and Computer Science, Physics, Geography
- Faculty 08 – Biology and Chemistry
- Faculty 09 – Agricultural Sciences, Nutritional Sciences and Environmental Management
- Faculty 10 – Veterinary Medicine
- Faculty 11 – Medicine

== Campus ==
Although the university has no defined campus, buildings and facilities are grouped together according to their subject areas and situated in various locations around Giessen. Philosophikum II, for example is an area on the outskirts of the city bordering the city forest. A number of faculty buildings and lecture theaters are located there, including Audimax, a building containing several lecture halls whose atrium is often the venue for concerts and disco nights, locally known as "Uni-Party".

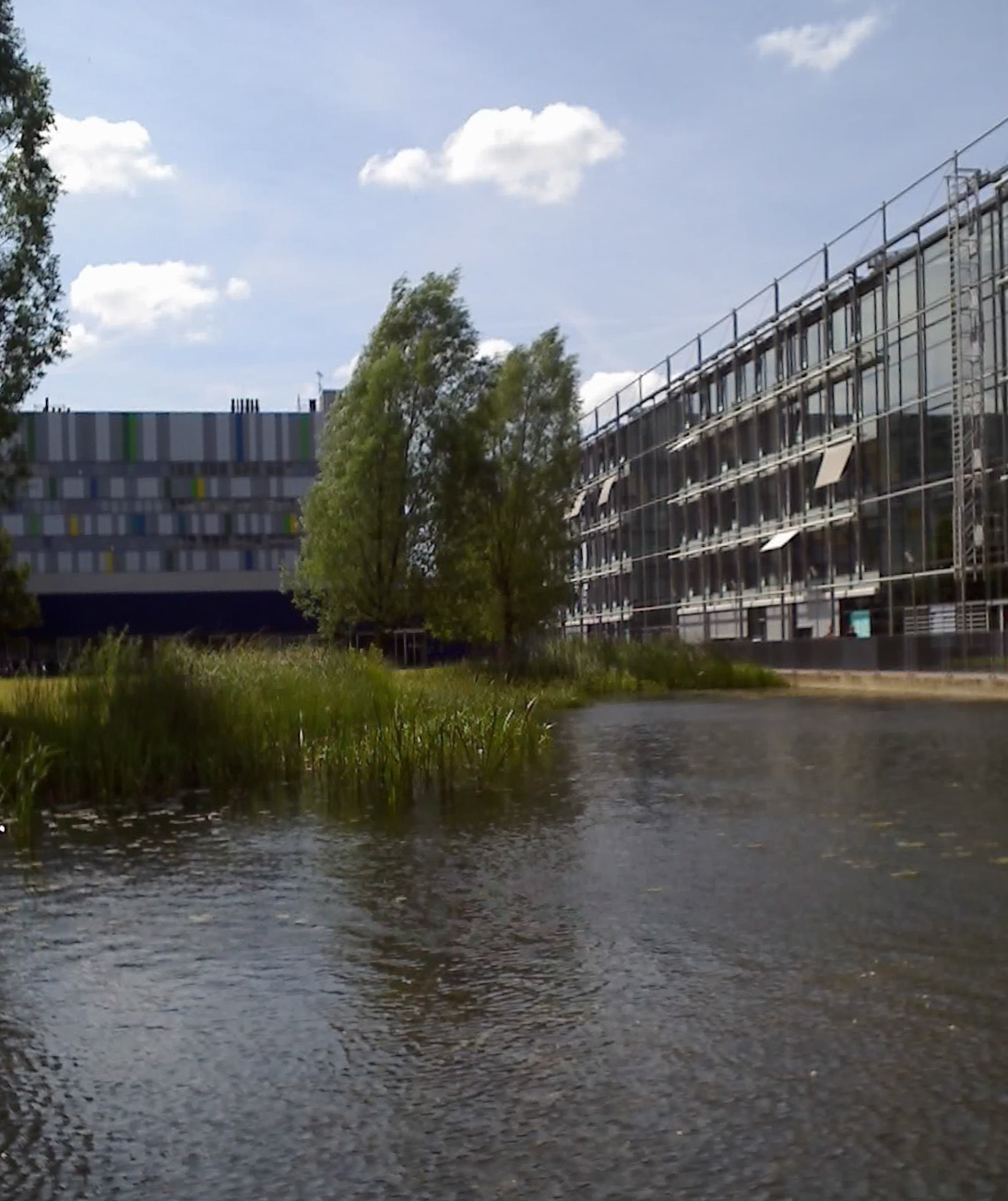
Interdisciplinary Research Center (IFZ) with the physics buildings in the background

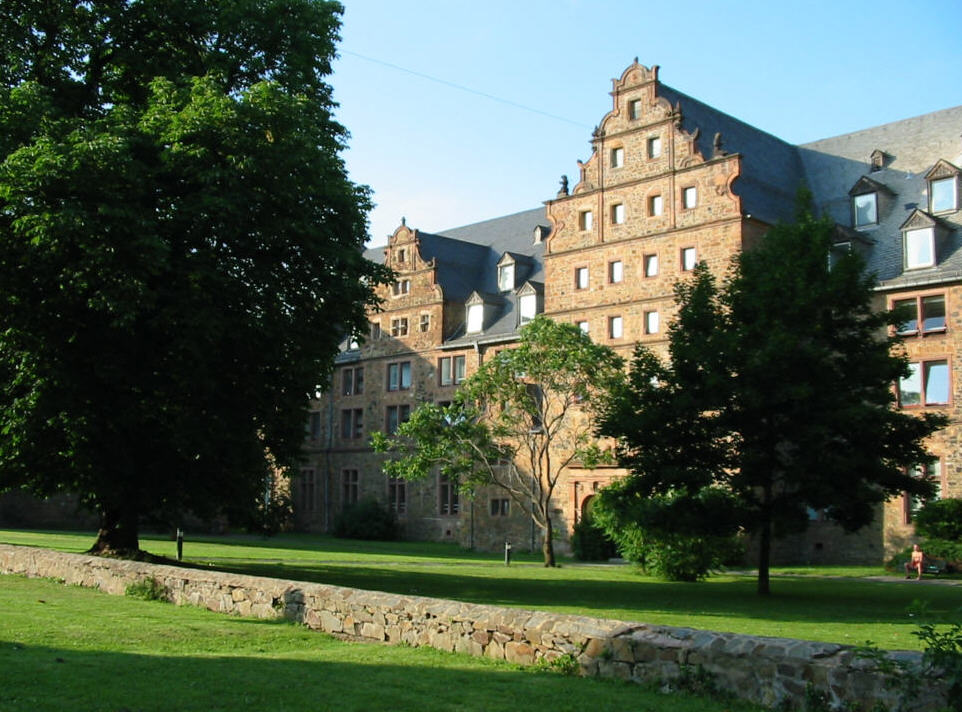
Zeughaus, a historic building in Giessen used by the agriculture departments and the university library

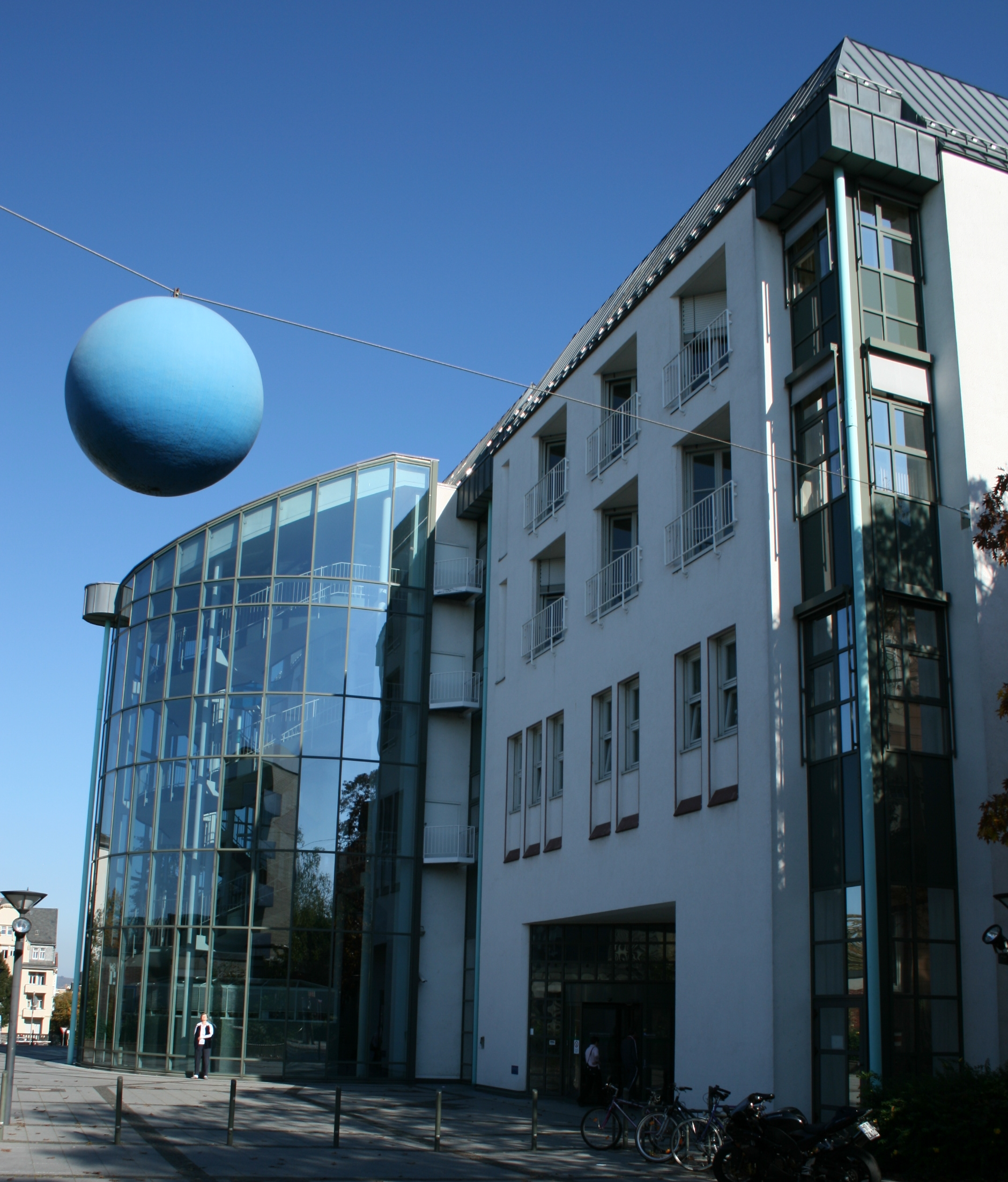
Surgery building of the university hospital

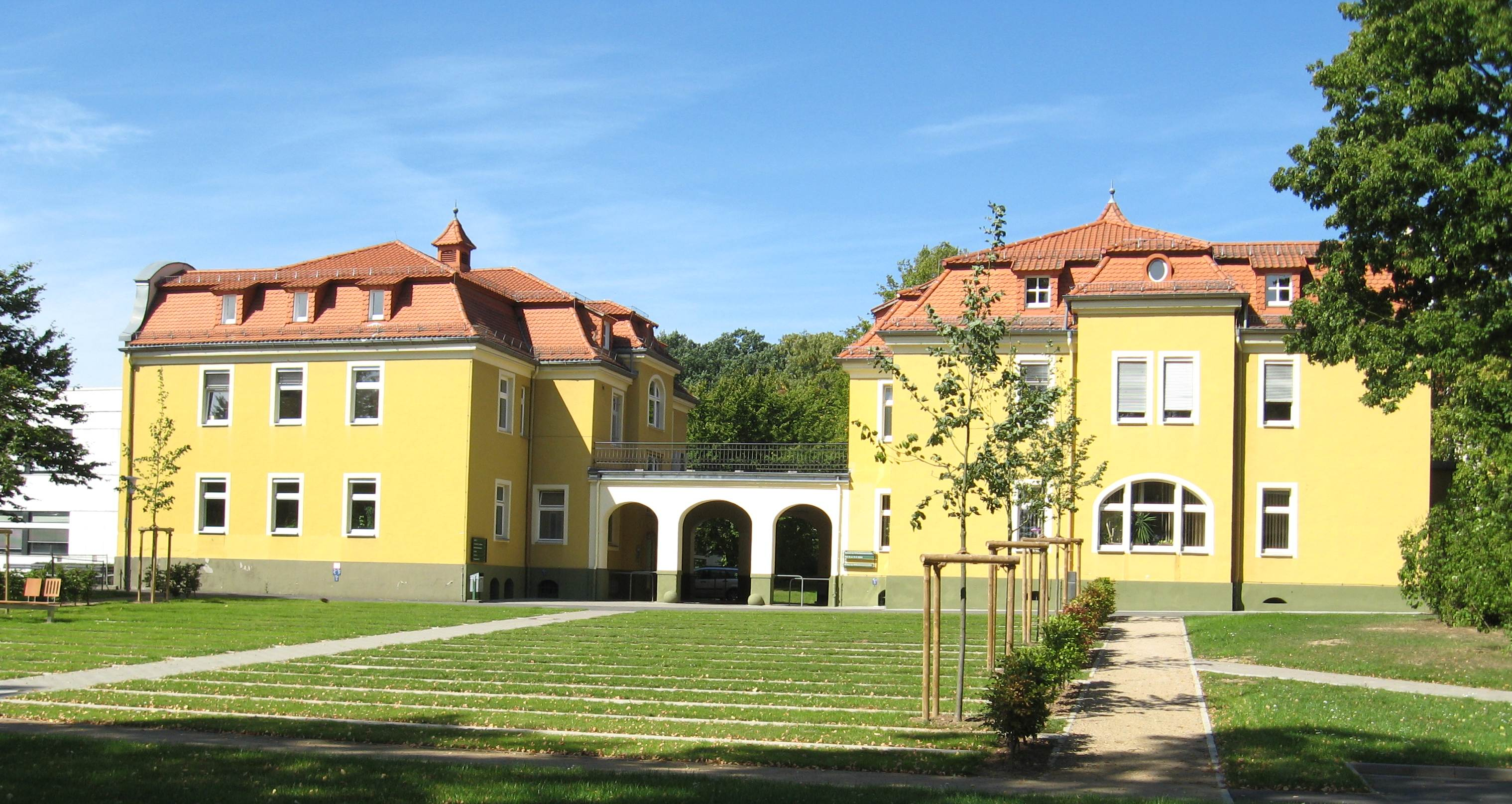
Department of Economics, Law and Business Studies

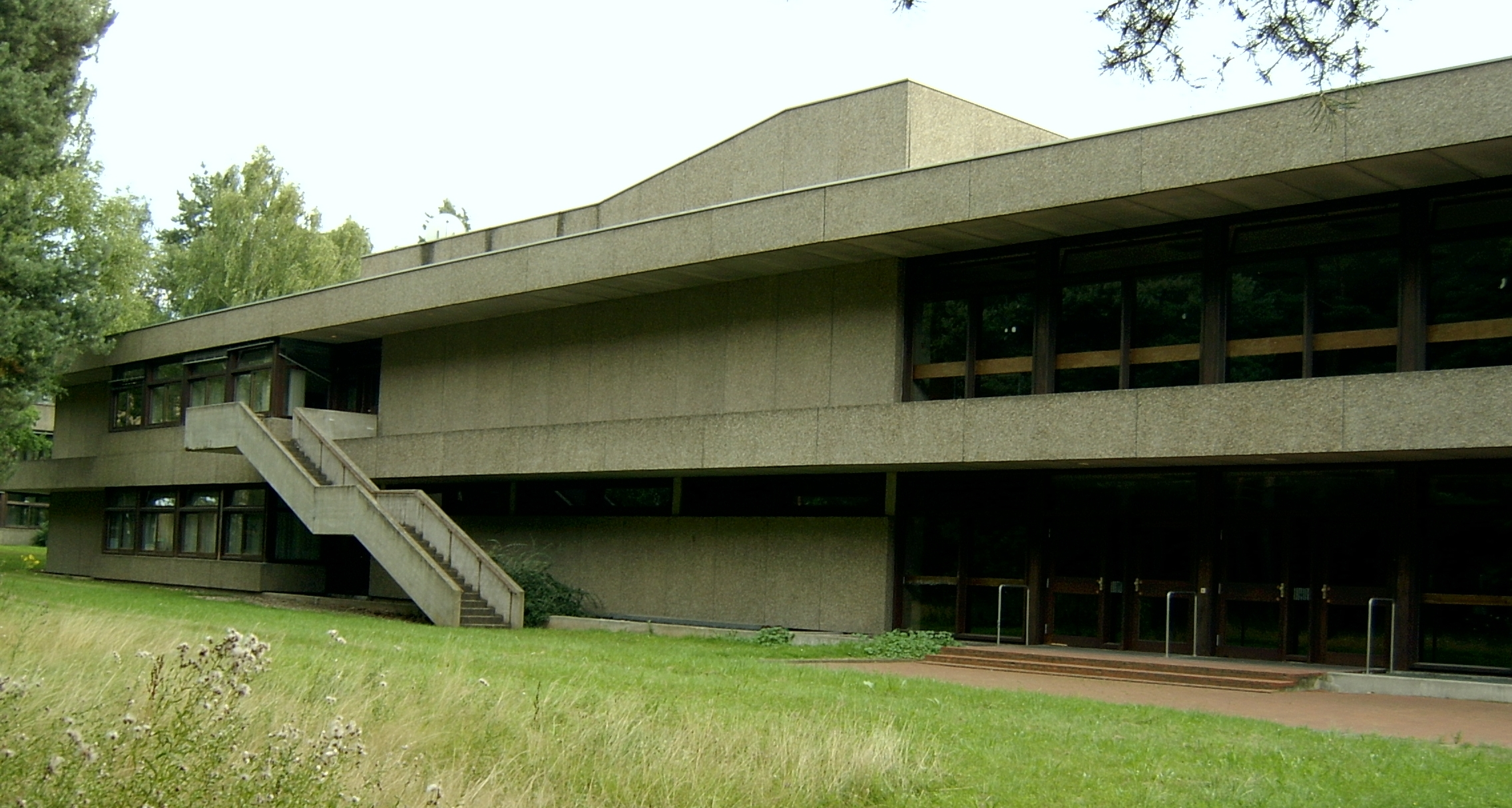
Audimax, the large auditorium of the arts/humanities campus

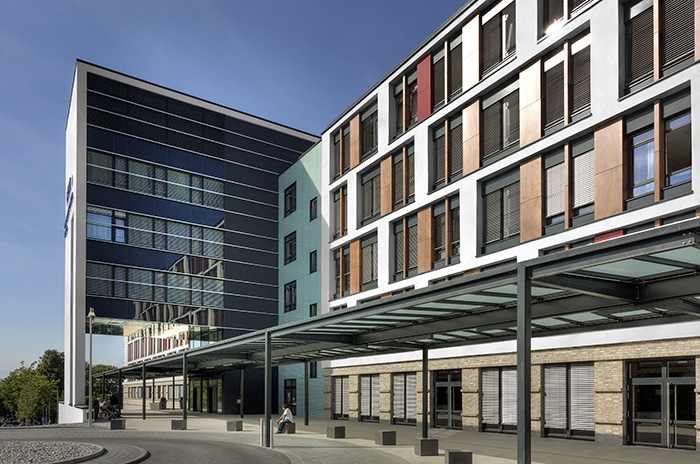
University hospital

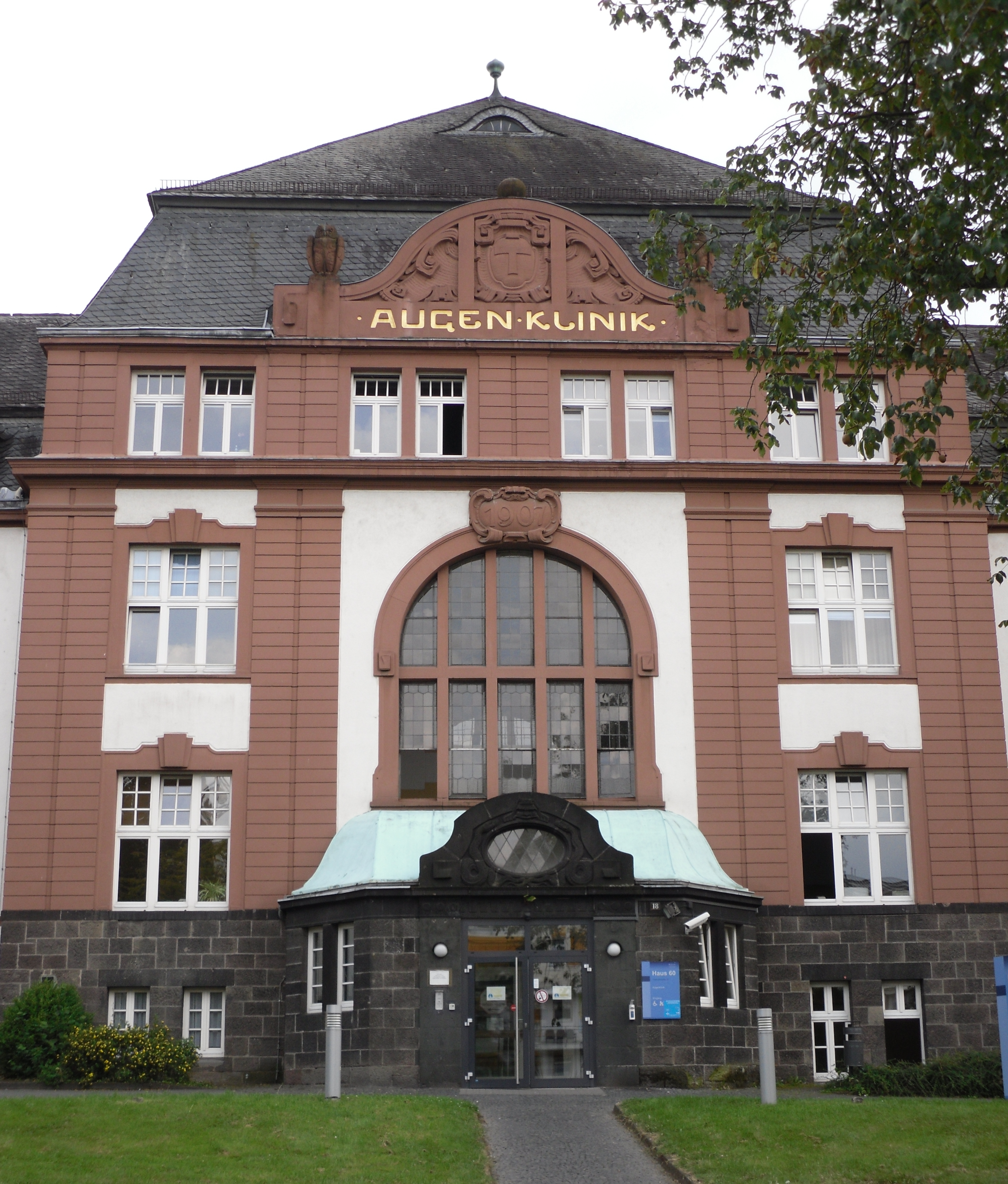
University eye clinic

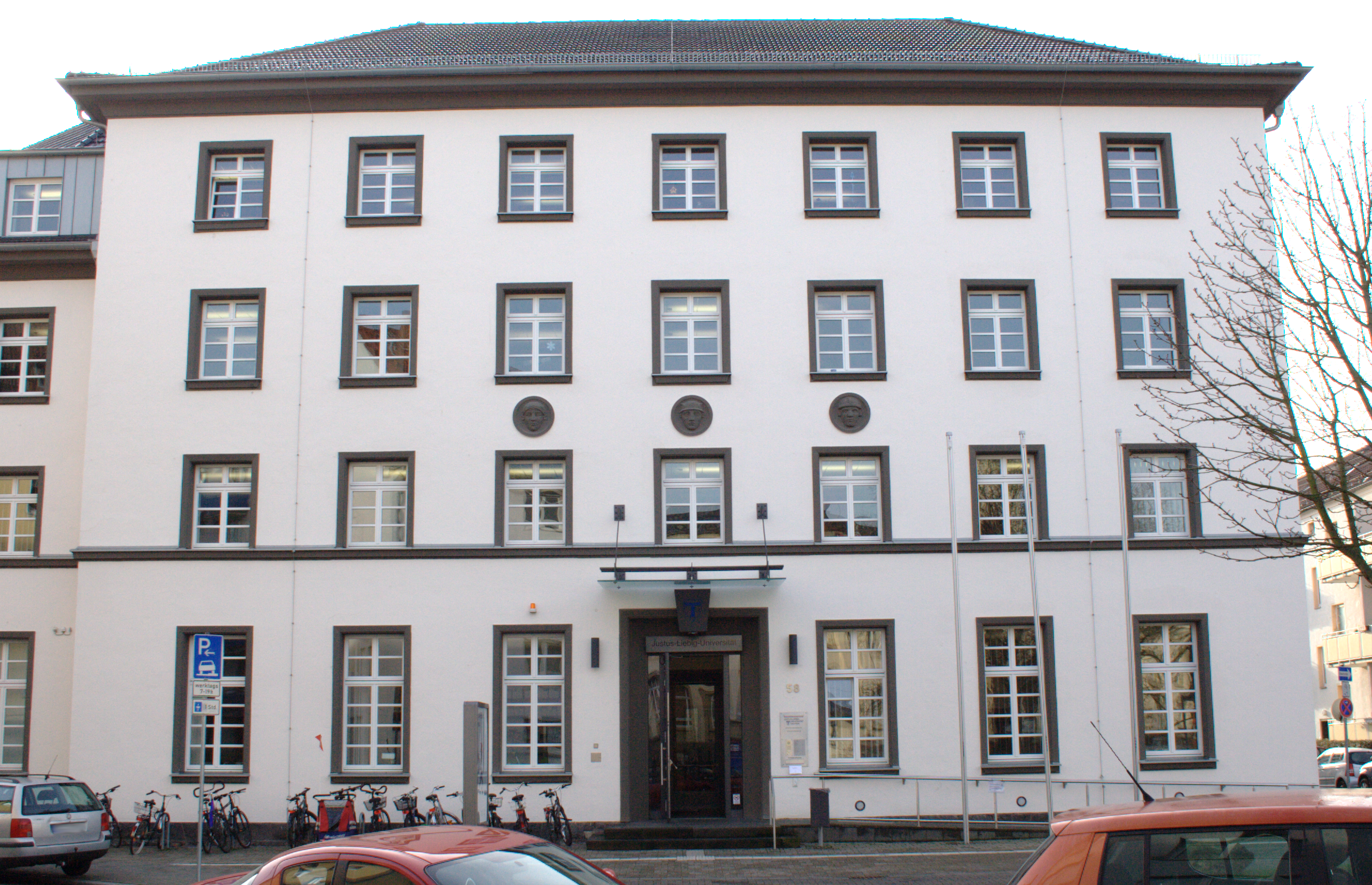
The student services building

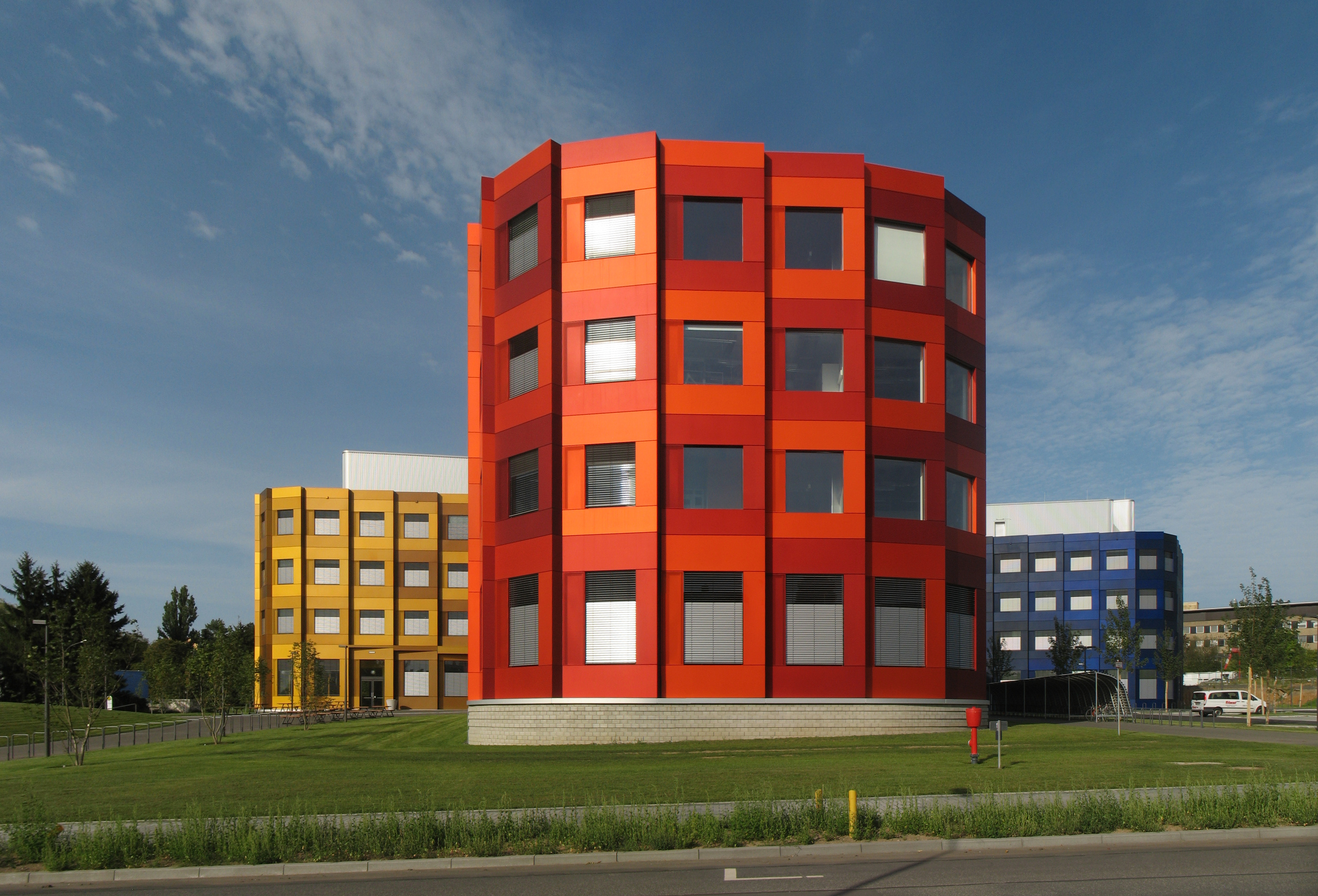
The Biomedical Research Center (BFZ)

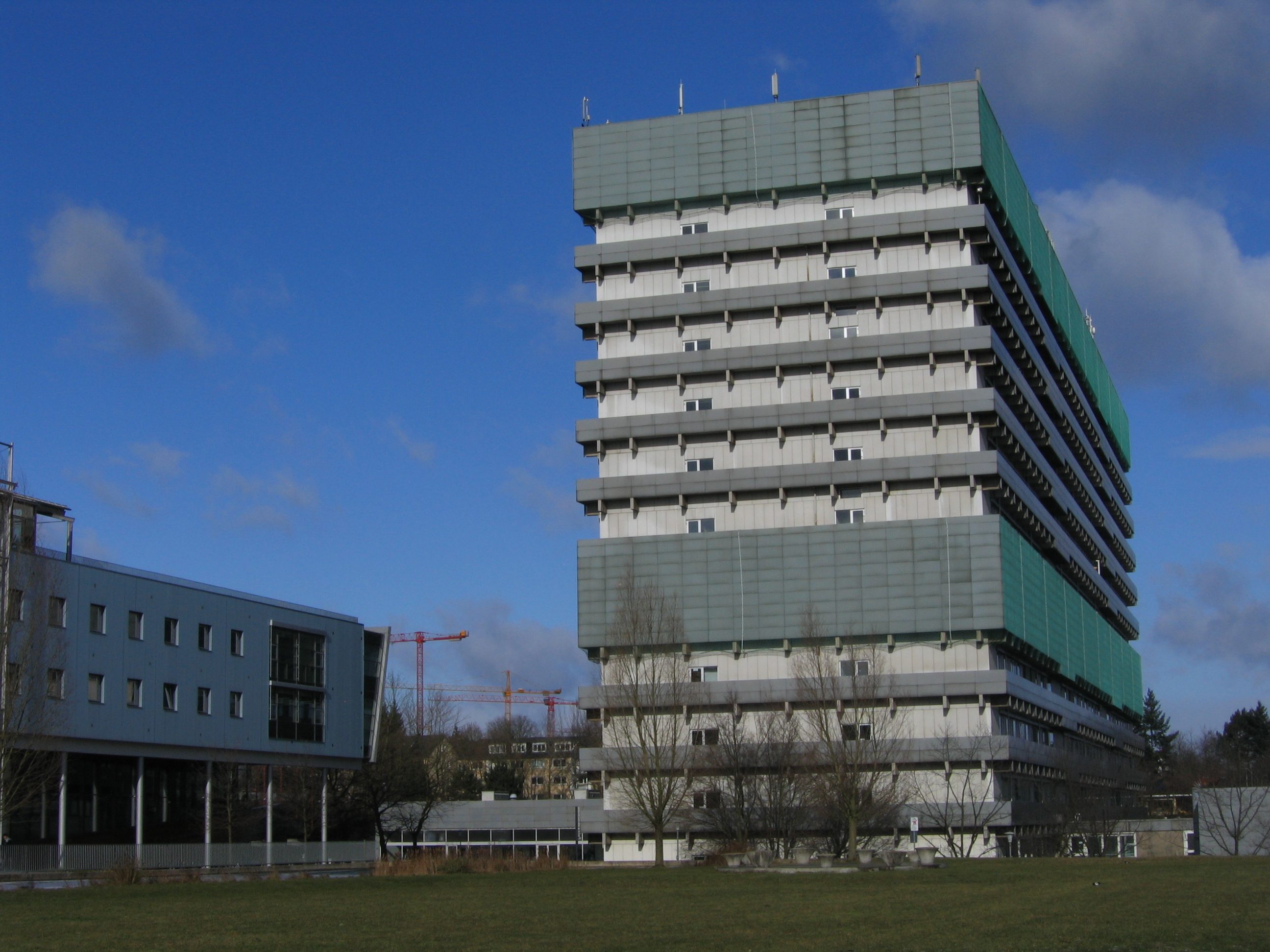
The chemistry building

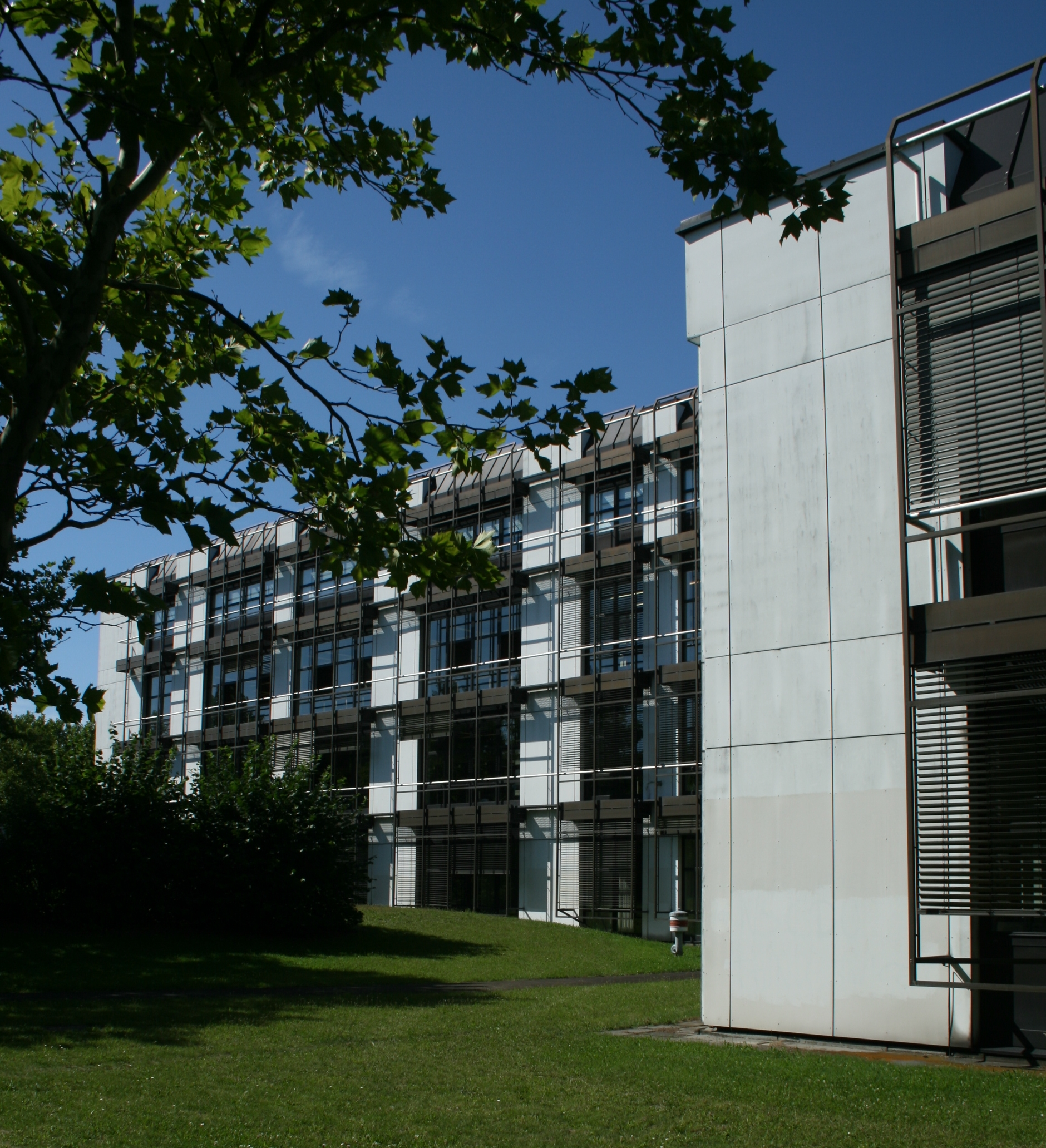
The main university library

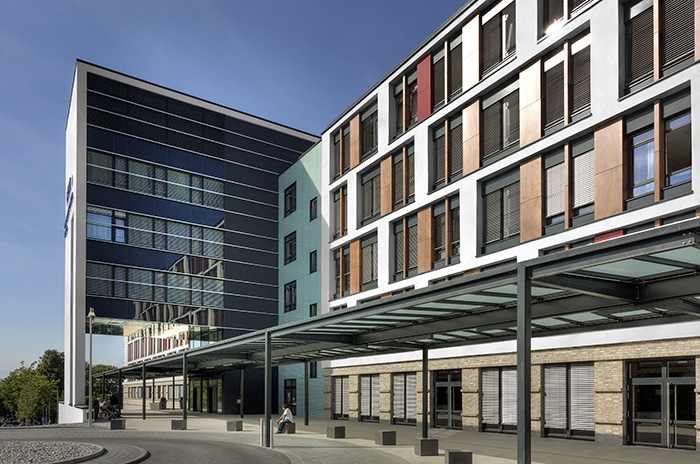
Giessen site

== Rankings ==
University rankings

Overall – Global & National
| QS World 2024 | 396 | 22 |
| THE World 2024 | 351–400 | 34–36 |
| ARWU World 2023 | 601–700 | 37–40 |

According to the 2024 QS World University Rankings, the university was placed 396th globally and 22nd nationally. In the Times Higher Education (THE) World University Rankings for 2023, it fell within the 351–400 bracket internationally and ranked between 34th and 36th at the national level. The 2023 Academic Ranking of World Universities (ARWU) placed the institution in the 601–700 range globally, and between 37th and 40th nationally.

== Notable faculty and alumni ==
Next to Liebig, famous professors at the university included the physician Georg Haas (who carried out the world's first human hemodialysis in Giessen in 1924), the theologian Adolf von Harnack, the lawyer Rudolf von Jhering, the economist and statistician Etienne Laspeyres, the physicist Wilhelm Conrad Röntgen, the mathematicians Moritz Pasch and Alfred Clebsch, the gestalt psychologist Kurt Koffka, the philologist and archaeologist Friedrich Gottlieb Welcker, the orientalists Friedrich Schwally, Paul E. Kahle and Eberhard Schrader, and the former president of Hebrew University of Jerusalem Benjamin Mazar. From 1901 to 1918 Hermann Friedrich Gmeiner was the first Professor for veterinary internal medicine at the Veterinary Faculty.

Recent alumni in the area of politics include current President of Germany and former Vice Chancellor and Minister for Foreign Affairs Frank-Walter Steinmeier and Brigitte Zypries, former Federal Minister of Economic Affairs and Energy and former Federal Minister of Justice.

Notable alumni of the university include organic chemist August Kekulé, X-ray physicist Simone Techert, health sociologist Thomas Abel, romantic dramatist and revolutionary Georg Büchner, literary and political historian Georg Gottfried Gervinus and botanist Johann Jacob Dillenius. Ernest Rutherford, the Rutherford atomic model's creator, studied in Giessen. Alumnus William Schlich founded Oxford University's forestry program. Ruth Kajander was a psychiatrist who pioneered use of chlorpromazine as a treatment for schizophrenia. Carl A. Schenck, who received his PhD in forestry from Giessen, founded the Biltmore Forest School, the first such school in the United States. Fitsum Assefa is an Ethiopian teacher and politician who leads the FDRE Minister of Planning and Development. Also Hans-Joachim Preuss, former Secretary General of Welthungerhilfe and managing director of the giz (gtz) graduated and worked at the University of Giessen.

== Points of interest ==
- Akademischer Forstgarten Gießen
- Botanischer Garten Gießen, the university's historic botanical garden
- University Hospital of Giessen and Marburg

== See also ==
- List of early modern universities in Europe
