= George Haas =

George Haas may refer to:

- George Haas Jr. (1920–2006), American businessman and polo player
- George Haas III (born 1963), American sport shooter
- George Haas & Sons, a confectioner in San Francisco, California
- Mule Haas (1903–1974, George William Haas), American baseball player
- Eddie Haas (born 1935, George Edwin Haas), American baseball player

== See also ==
- Georg Haas (disambiguation)
