= Georg Haas =

Georg Haas may refer to:

- Georg Haas (paleontologist) (1905–1981), Austrian-born Israeli herpetologist and paleontologist
- Georg Haas (physician) (1886–1971), German physician
- Georg Friedrich Haas (born 1953), Austrian composer
- Georg Haas (engraver) (1756–1817), Danish engraver
