= Chlorpromazine =

Typical antipsychotic medication

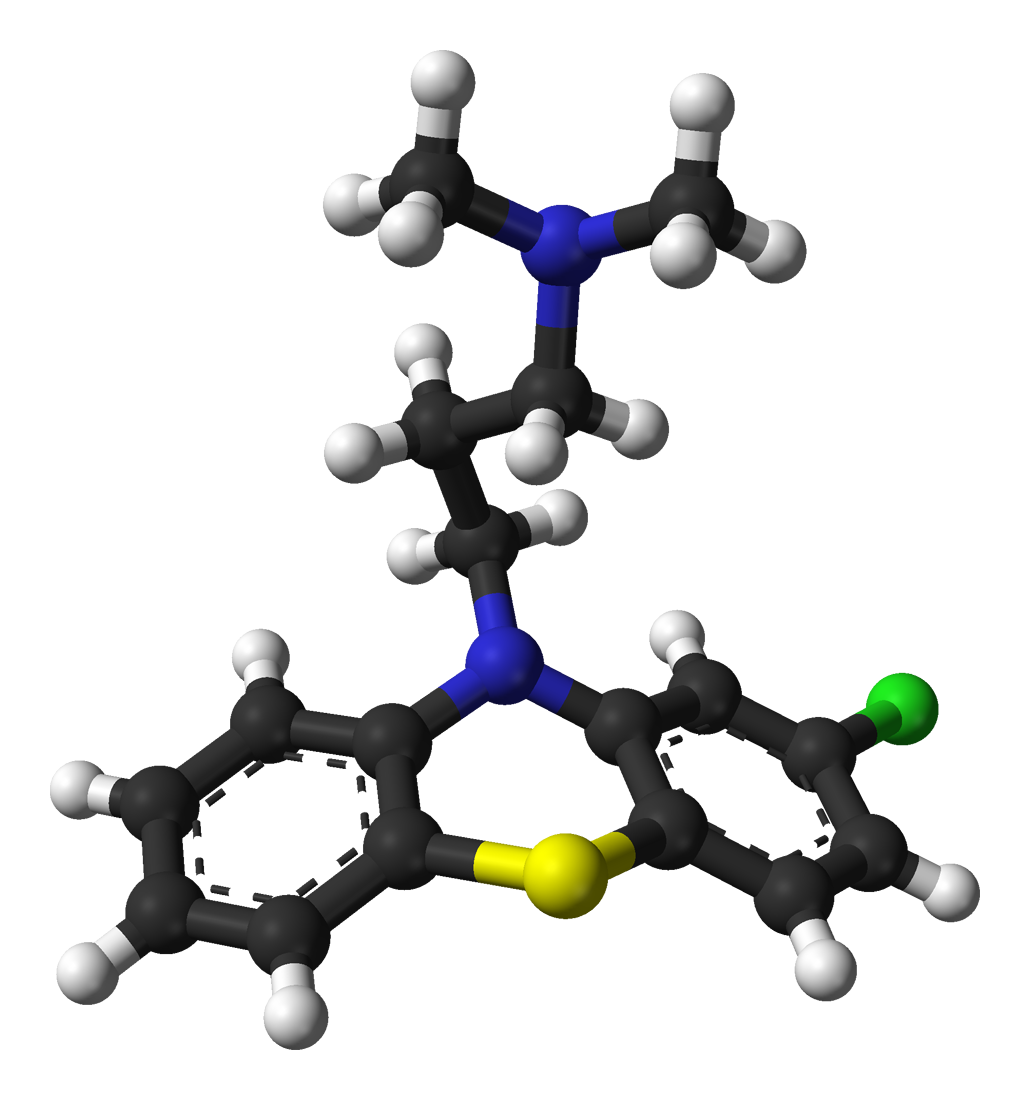

Clinical data
- Trade names: Thorazine, Largactil, others
- AHFS/Drugs.com: Monograph
- MedlinePlus: a682040
- License data: US DailyMed: Chlorpromazine
- Pregnancy category: AU: C
- Routes of administration: By mouth, rectal, intramuscular, intravenous
- Drug class: Typical antipsychotic
- ATC code: N05AA01 (WHO)

Legal status
- Legal status: AU: S4 (Prescription only); BR: Class C1 (Other controlled substances); NZ: Prescription only; UK: POM (Prescription only); US: ℞-only; EU: Rx-only; In general: ℞ (Prescription only)

Pharmacokinetic data
- Bioavailability: 10–80% (Oral; large interindividual variation)
- Protein binding: 90–99%
- Metabolism: Liver, mostly CYP2D6-mediated
- Elimination half-life: 30 hours
- Excretion: Kidney (43–65% in 24 hrs)

Identifiers
- IUPAC name: 3-(2-chloro-10H-phenothiazin-10-yl)-N,N-dimethylpropan-1-amine
- CAS Number: 50-53-3 (free base) 69-09-0 (hydrochloride)
- PubChem CID: 2726
- IUPHAR/BPS: 83
- DrugBank: DB00477
- ChemSpider: 2625
- UNII: U42B7VYA4P
- KEGG: D00270; as HCl: D00789
- ChEBI: CHEBI:3647
- ChEMBL: ChEMBL71
- PDB ligand: Z80 (PDBe, RCSB PDB)
- CompTox Dashboard (EPA): DTXSID0022808
- ECHA InfoCard: 100.000.042

Chemical and physical data
- Formula: C_{17}H_{19}ClN_{2}S
- Molar mass: 318.86 g·mol^{−1}
- 3D model (JSmol): Interactive image
- SMILES: CN(C)CCCN1c2ccccc2Sc2ccc(Cl)cc21
- InChI: InChI=1S/C17H19ClN2S/c1-19(2)10-5-11-20-14-6-3-4-7-16(14)21-17-9-8-13(18)12-15(17)20/h3-4,6-9,12H,5,10-11H2,1-2H3; Key:ZPEIMTDSQAKGNT-UHFFFAOYSA-N

Chlorpromazine (CPZ), marketed under the brand names Thorazine and Largactil among others, is an antipsychotic medication. It is primarily used to treat psychotic disorders such as schizophrenia. Other uses include the treatment of bipolar disorder, severe behavioral problems in children including those with attention deficit hyperactivity disorder, nausea and vomiting, anxiety before surgery, and hiccups that do not improve following other measures. It can be given orally (by mouth), by intramuscular injection (injection into a muscle), or intravenously (injection into a vein).

Chlorpromazine is in the typical antipsychotic class, and, chemically, is one of the phenothiazines. Its mechanism of action is not entirely clear but is believed to be related to its ability as a dopamine antagonist. It has antiserotonergic and antihistaminergic properties.

Common side effects include movement problems, sleepiness, dry mouth, low blood pressure upon standing, and increased weight. Serious side effects may include the potentially permanent movement disorder tardive dyskinesia, neuroleptic malignant syndrome, severe lowering of the seizure threshold, and low white blood cell levels. In older people with psychosis as a result of dementia, it may increase the risk of death. It is unclear if it is safe for use in pregnancy.

Chlorpromazine was developed in 1950 and was the first antipsychotic on the market. It is on the World Health Organization's List of Essential Medicines. Its introduction has been labeled as one of the great advances in the history of psychiatry. It is available as a generic medication.

== Medical uses ==
Chlorpromazine is used in the treatment of both acute and chronic psychoses, including schizophrenia and the manic phase of bipolar disorder, as well as amphetamine-induced psychosis.

Controversially, some psychiatric patients may be given chlorpromazine by force, even if they do not suffer any of the typical conditions the drug is prescribed for.

In a 2013 comparison of fifteen antipsychotics in schizophrenia, chlorpromazine demonstrated mild-standard effectiveness. It was 13% more effective than lurasidone and iloperidone, approximately as effective as ziprasidone and asenapine, and 12–16% less effective than haloperidol, quetiapine, and aripiprazole.

A 2014 systematic review carried out by Cochrane included 55 trials that compared the effectiveness of chlorpromazine versus placebo for the treatment of schizophrenia. Compared to the placebo group, patients under chlorpromazine experienced less relapse during 6 months to 2 years follow-up. No difference was found between the two groups beyond two years of follow-up. Patients under chlorpromazine showed a global improvement in symptoms and functioning. The systematic review also highlighted the fact that the side effects of the drug were 'severe and debilitating', including sedation, considerable weight gain, a lowering of blood pressure, and an increased risk of acute movement disorders. They also noted that the quality of evidence of the 55 included trials was very low and that 315 trials could not be included in the systematic review due to their poor quality. They called for further research on the subject, as chlorpromazine is a cheap benchmark drug and one of the most used treatments for schizophrenia worldwide.

Chlorpromazine has also been used in porphyria and as part of tetanus treatment. It is still recommended for short-term management of severe anxiety and psychotic aggression. Resistant and severe hiccups, severe nausea/emesis, and preanesthetic conditioning are other uses. Symptoms of delirium in hospitalized AIDS patients have been effectively treated with low doses of chlorpromazine.

=== Other uses ===
Chlorpromazine is occasionally used off-label for treatment of severe migraine. It is often, particularly as palliation, used in small doses to reduce nausea by opioid-treated cancer patients and to intensify and prolong the analgesia of the opioids as well. Efficacy has been shown in treatment of symptomatic hypertensive emergency.

In Germany, chlorpromazine still carries label indications for insomnia, severe pruritus, and preanesthesia.

Chlorpromazine has been used as a hallucinogen antidote or "trip killer" to block the effects of serotonergic psychedelics like psilocybin, lysergic acid diethylamide (LSD), and mescaline. However, it was said to not be completely effective and could exacerbate symptoms under certain situations. The results of clinical studies of chlorpromazine for this use have been inconsistent, with reduced effects, no change in effects, and even enhanced effects all reported. Intravenous chlorpromazine is described as completely abolishing the autonomic and psychoactive effects of LSD, whereas oral chlorpromazine is said to be much less effective.

Chlorpromazine and other phenothiazines have been demonstrated to possess antimicrobial properties, but are not currently used for this purpose except for a very small number of cases. For example, Miki et al. 1992 trialed daily doses of chlorpromazine, reversing chloroquine resistance in Plasmodium chabaudi isolates in mice. Weeks et al., 2018 find that it also possesses a wide spectrum anthelmintic effect.

Chlorpromazine is an antagonist of several insect monoamine receptors. It is the most active antagonist known of silk moth (Bombyx mori) octopamine receptor α, intermediate for Bm tyramine receptors 1 & 2, weak for Drosophila octopamine receptor β, high for Drosophila tyramine receptor 1, intermediate for migratory locust (Locusta migratoria) tyramine receptor 1, and high for American cockroach (Periplaneta americana) octopamine receptor α and tyramine receptor 1.

Comparison of chlorpromazine to placebo
Measured outcome	Findings summary	Findings range	Quality of evidence
Global effects
No improvement (9 weeks – 6 months)	30% less risk of having no improvement in mental state, behaviour and functioning	RR 0.7 CI 0.6 to 0.9	Very low (estimate of effect uncertain)
Relapse (6 months – 2 years)	35% less risk of relapse	RR 0.7 CI 0.5 to 0.9	Very low (estimate of effect uncertain)

== Contraindications ==
Absolute contraindications include:

- Circulatory depression
- CNS depression
- Coma
- Drug intoxication
- Bone marrow suppression
- Phaeochromocytoma
- Hepatic failure
- Active liver disease
- Previous hypersensitivity (including jaundice, agranulocytosis, etc.) to phenothiazines, especially chlorpromazine, or any of the excipients in the formulation being used.

Relative contraindications include:

- Epilepsy
- Parkinson's disease
- Myasthenia gravis
- Hypoparathyroidism
- Prostatic hypertrophy

Very rarely, elongation of the QT interval, due to hERG blockade, may occur, increasing the risk of potentially fatal arrhythmias.

== Adverse effects ==
There appears to be a dose-dependent risk for seizures with chlorpromazine treatment. Tardive dyskinesia (involuntary, repetitive body movements) and akathisia (a feeling of inner restlessness and inability to stay still) are less commonly seen with chlorpromazine than they are with high potency typical antipsychotics such as haloperidol or trifluoperazine, and some evidence suggests that, with conservative dosing, the incidence of such effects for chlorpromazine may be comparable to that of newer agents such as risperidone or olanzapine.

Chlorpromazine may deposit in ocular tissues when taken in high dosages for long periods of time.

Comparison of chlorpromazine to placebo
Measured outcome	Findings summary	Findings range	Quality of evidence
Adverse effects
Weight gain	5 times more likely to have considerable weight gain, around 40% with chlorpromazine gaining weight	RR 4.9 CI 2.3 to 10.4	Very low (estimate of effect uncertain)
Sedation	3 times more likely to cause sedation, around 30% with chlorpromazine	RR 2.8 CI 2.3 to 3.5	Very low (estimate of effect uncertain)
Acute movement disorder	3.5 times more likely to cause easily reversible but unpleasant severe stiffening of muscles, around 6% with chlorpromazine	RR 3.5 CI 1.5 to 8.0	Very low (estimate of effect uncertain)
Parkinsonism	2 times more likely to cause parkinsonism (symptoms such as tremor, hesitancy of movement, decreased facial expression), around 17% with chlorpromazine	RR 2.1 CI 1.6 to 2.8	Very low (estimate of effect uncertain)
Decreased blood pressure with dizziness	3 times more likely to cause decreased blood pressure and dizziness, around 15% with chlorpromazine	RR 2.4 CI 1.7 to 3.3	Very low (estimate of effect uncertain)

=== Discontinuation ===
The British National Formulary recommends a gradual withdrawal when discontinuing antipsychotics to avoid acute withdrawal syndrome or rapid relapse. Symptoms of withdrawal commonly include nausea, vomiting, and loss of appetite. Other symptoms may include restlessness, increased sweating, and trouble sleeping. Less commonly, there may be a feeling of the world spinning, numbness, or muscle pains. Symptoms generally resolve after a short period of time.

There is tentative evidence that discontinuation of antipsychotics can result in psychosis. It may also result in reoccurrence of the condition that is being treated. Rarely, tardive dyskinesia can occur when the medication is stopped.

== Interactions ==
Consuming food prior to taking chlorpromazine orally limits its absorption; likewise, cotreatment with benztropine can also reduce chlorpromazine absorption. Alcohol can also reduce chlorpromazine absorption. Antacids slow chlorpromazine absorption. Lithium and chronic treatment with barbiturates can increase chlorpromazine clearance significantly. Tricyclic antidepressants (TCAs) can decrease chlorpromazine clearance and hence increase chlorpromazine exposure. Cotreatment with CYP1A2 inhibitors like ciprofloxacin, fluvoxamine or vemurafenib can reduce chlorpromazine clearance and hence increase exposure and potentially also adverse effects. Chlorpromazine can also potentiate the CNS depressant effects of drugs like barbiturates, benzodiazepines, opioids, lithium and anesthetics and hence increase the potential for adverse effects such as respiratory depression and sedation.

Chlorprozamine is also a moderate inhibitor of CYP2D6 and a substrate for CYP2D6 and hence can inhibit its own metabolism. It can also inhibit the clearance of CYP2D6 substrates such as dextromethorphan, potentiating their effects. Other drugs like codeine and tamoxifen, which require CYP2D6-mediated activation into their respective active metabolites, may have their therapeutic effects attenuated. Likewise, CYP2D6 inhibitors such as paroxetine or fluoxetine can reduce chlorpromazine clearance, increasing serum levels of chlorpromazine and potentially its adverse effects. Chlorpromazine also reduces phenytoin levels and increases valproic acid levels. It also reduces propranolol clearance and antagonizes the therapeutic effects of antidiabetic agents, levodopa (a Parkinson's medication. This is likely because chlorpromazine antagonizes the D_{2} receptor which is one of the receptors dopamine, a levodopa metabolite, activates), amphetamines and anticoagulants. It may also interact with anticholinergic drugs such as orphenadrine to produce hypoglycaemia (low blood sugar).

Chlorpromazine may also interact with epinephrine (adrenaline) to produce a paradoxical fall in blood pressure. Monoamine oxidase inhibitors (MAOIs) and thiazide diuretics may also accentuate the orthostatic hypotension experienced by those receiving chlorpromazine treatment. Quinidine may interact with chlorpromazine to increase myocardial depression. Likewise, it may also antagonize the effects of clonidine and guanethidine. It also may reduce the seizure threshold and hence a corresponding titration of anticonvulsant treatments should be considered. Prochlorperazine and desferrioxamine may also interact with chlorpromazine to produce transient metabolic encephalopathy.

Other drugs that prolong the QT interval, such as quinidine, verapamil, amiodarone, sotalol and methadone, may also interact with chlorpromazine to produce additive QT interval prolongation.

Chlorpromazine is a serotonin 5-HT_{2A} receptor antagonist and has been found to reduce the hallucinogenic effects of serotonergic psychedelics like LSD.

== Pharmacology ==
Chlorpromazine is classified as a low-potency typical antipsychotic. Low-potency antipsychotics have more anticholinergic side effects, such as dry mouth, sedation, and constipation, and lower rates of extrapyramidal side effects, while high-potency antipsychotics (such as haloperidol) have the reverse profile.

=== Pharmacodynamics ===
Chlorpromazine
Site	Ki	Species	Ref
5-HT_{1A}	3115	Human	
5-HT_{1B}	1489	Human	
5-HT_{1D}	452	Human	
5-HT_{1E}	344	Human	
5-HT_{2A}	2.75	Human	
5-HT_{2B}	6.0	Bovine	
5-HT_{2C}	25	Human	
5-HT_{3}	776	Human	
5-HT_{5A}	118	Human	
5-HT_{6}	19.5	Human	
5-HT_{7}	21	Human	
α_{1A}	0.28	Human	
α_{1B}	0.81	Human	
α_{2A}	184	Human	
α_{2B}	28	Human	
α_{2C}	46	Human	
β_{1}	10000+	Human	
β_{2}	10000+	Human	
M_{1}	47	Human	
M_{2}	433	Human	
M_{3}	47	Human	
M_{4}	151	Human	
D_{1}	114.8	Human	
D_{2}	7.244	Human	
D_{3}	6.9	Human	
D_{4}	32.36	Human	
H_{1}	4.25	Human	
H_{2}	174	Human	
H_{3}	1000	Human	
H_{4}	5048	Human	
NET	2,443	Human	
DAT	10000+	Human	

Chlorpromazine is a very effective antagonist of D2 dopamine receptors and similar receptors, such as D3 and D5. Unlike most other drugs of this genre, it also has a high affinity for D1 receptors. Blocking these receptors causes diminished neurotransmitter binding in the forebrain, resulting in many different effects. Dopamine, unable to bind with a receptor, causes a feedback loop that causes dopaminergic neurons to release more dopamine. Therefore, upon first taking the drug, patients will experience an increase in dopaminergic neural activity. Eventually, dopamine production in the neurons will drop substantially and dopamine will be removed from the synaptic cleft. At this point, neural activity decreases greatly; the continual blockade of receptors only compounds this effect.

Chlorpromazine acts as an antagonist (blocking agent) on different postsynaptic and presynaptic receptors:

- Dopamine receptors (subtypes D_{1}, D_{2}, D_{3} and D_{4}), which account for its different antipsychotic properties on productive and unproductive symptoms, in the mesolimbic dopamine system accounts for the antipsychotic effect whereas the blockade in the nigrostriatal system produces the extrapyramidal effects
- Serotonin receptors (5-HT_{2}, 5-HT_{6} and 5-HT_{7}), with anxiolytic, antidepressant and antiaggressive properties as well as an attenuation of extrapyramidal side effects, but also leading to weight gain and ejaculation difficulties.
- Histamine receptors (H_{1} receptors, accounting for sedation, antiemetic effect, vertigo, and weight gain)
- α_{1}- and α_{2}-adrenergic receptors (accounting for sympatholytic properties, lowering of blood pressure, reflex tachycardia, vertigo, sedation, hypersalivation and incontinence as well as sexual dysfunction, but may also attenuate pseudoparkinsonism – controversial. Also associated with weight gain as a result of blockage of the adrenergic alpha 1 receptor as well as with intraoperative floppy iris syndrome due to its effect on the iris dilator muscle.
- M_{1} and M_{2} muscarinic acetylcholine receptors (causing anticholinergic symptoms such as dry mouth, blurred vision, constipation, difficulty or inability to urinate, sinus tachycardia, electrocardiographic changes and loss of memory, but the anticholinergic action may attenuate extrapyramidal side effects).

The presumed effectiveness of the antipsychotic drugs relied on their ability to block dopamine receptors. This assumption arose from the dopamine hypothesis that maintains that both schizophrenia and bipolar disorder are a result of excessive dopamine activity. Furthermore, psychomotor stimulants like cocaine that increase dopamine levels can cause psychotic symptoms if taken in excess.

Chlorpromazine and other typical antipsychotics are primarily blockers of D2 receptors. An almost perfect correlation exists between the therapeutic dose of a typical antipsychotic and the drug's affinity for the D2 receptor. Therefore, a larger dose is required if the drug's affinity for the D2 receptor is relatively weak. A correlation exists between average clinical potency and affinity of the antipsychotics for dopamine receptors. Chlorpromazine tends to have a greater effect at serotonin receptors than at D2 receptors, which is notably the opposite effect of the other typical antipsychotics. Therefore, chlorpromazine's effects on dopamine and serotonin receptors are more similar to the atypical antipsychotics than to the typical antipsychotics.

Chlorpromazine and other antipsychotics with sedative properties such as promazine and thioridazine are among the most potent agents at α-adrenergic receptors. Furthermore, they are also among the most potent antipsychotics at histamine H1 receptors. This finding is in agreement with the pharmaceutical development of chlorpromazine and other antipsychotics as anti-histamine agents. Furthermore, the brain has a higher density of histamine H1 receptors than any body organ examined which may account for why chlorpromazine and other phenothiazine antipsychotics are as potent at these sites as the most potent classical antihistamines.

In addition to influencing the neurotransmitters dopamine, serotonin, epinephrine, norepinephrine, and acetylcholine it has been reported that antipsychotic drugs could achieve glutamatergic effects. This mechanism involves the direct effects of antipsychotic drugs on glutamate receptors. By using the technique of functional neurochemical assay chlorpromazine and phenothiazine derivatives have been shown to have inhibitory effects on NMDA receptors that appeared to be mediated by action at the Zn site. It was found that there is an increase of NMDA activity at low concentrations and suppression at high concentrations of the drug. No significant difference in glycine activity from the effects of chlorpromazine was reported. Further work will be necessary to determine if the influence in NMDA receptors by antipsychotic drugs contributes to their effectiveness.

Chlorpromazine does also act as a FIASMA (functional inhibitor of acid sphingomyelinase).

Chlorpromazine is an antagonist to H_{1} receptors (provoking antiallergic effects), H_{2} receptors (reduction of forming of gastric juice), M_{1} and M_{2} receptors (dry mouth, reduction in forming of gastric juice) and some 5-HT receptors (different anti-allergic/gastrointestinal actions).

Because it acts on so many receptors, chlorpromazine is often referred to as a "dirty drug".

=== Pharmacokinetics ===
Pharmacokinetic parameters of chlorpromazine
Bioavailability	t_{max}	C_{SS}	Protein bound	V_{d}	t_{1/2}	Details of metabolism	Excretion	Notes
10–80%	1–4 hours (Oral); 6–24 hours (IM)	100–300 ng/mL	90–99%	10–35 L/kg (mean: 22 L/kg)	30±7 hours	CYP2D6, CYP1A2—mediated into over 10 major metabolites. The major routes of metabolism include hydroxylation, N-oxidation, sulfoxidation, demethylation, deamination and conjugation. There is little evidence supporting the development of metabolic tolerance or an increase in the metabolism of chlorpromazine due to microsomal liver enzymes following multiple doses of the drug.	Urine (43–65% after 24 hours)	Its high degree of lipophilicity (fat solubility) allows it to be detected in the urine for up to 18 months. Less than 1% of the unchanged drug is excreted via the kidneys in the urine, in which 20–70% is excreted as conjugated or unconjugated metabolites, whereas 5–6% is excreted in feces.

Three common metabolites of chlorpromazine

== History ==
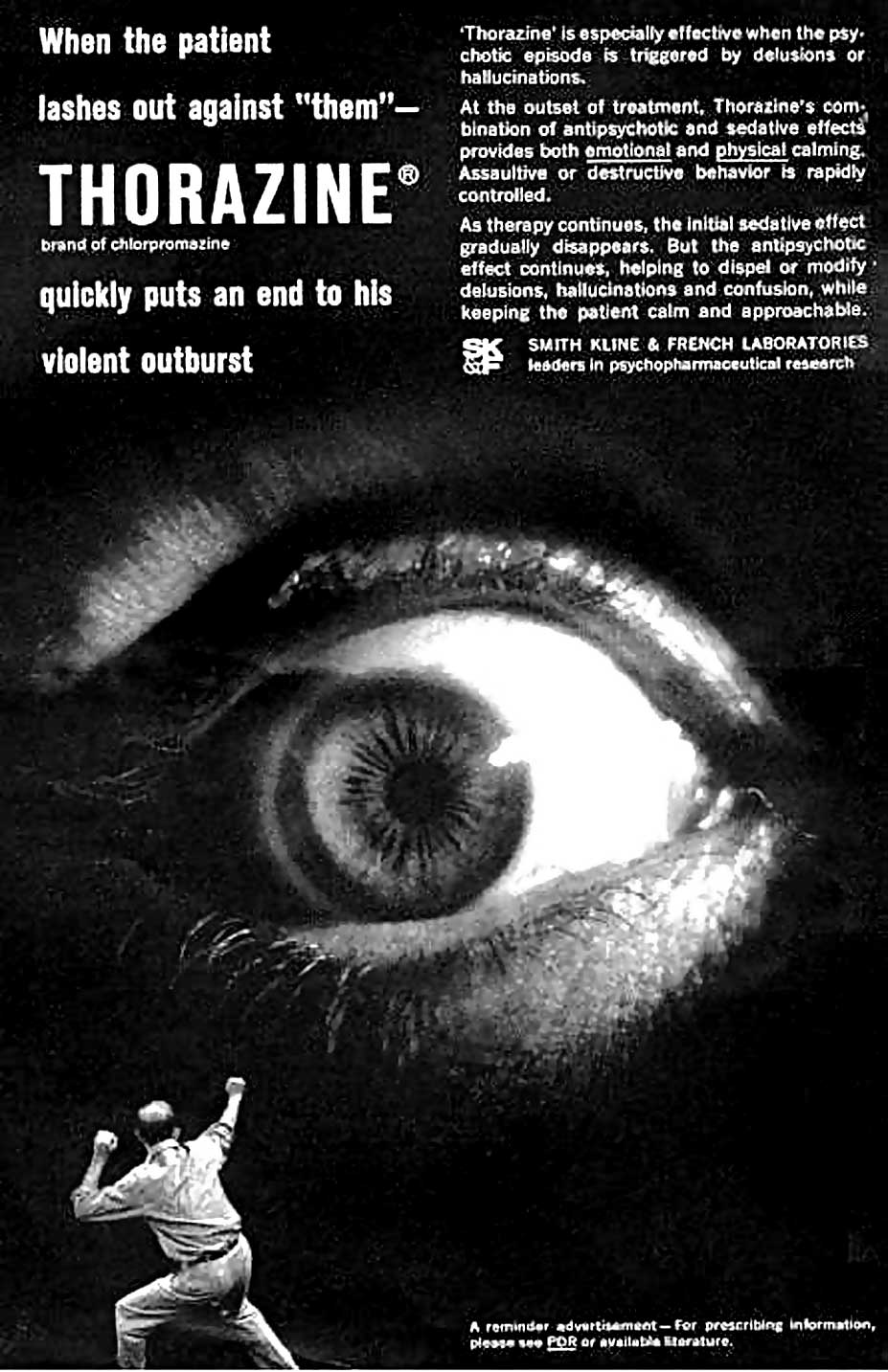
Advertisement for Thorazine (chlorpromazine) from the early 1960s

In 1933, the French pharmaceutical company Laboratoires Rhône-Poulenc began to search for new antihistamines. In 1947, it synthesized promethazine, a phenothiazine derivative, which was found to have more pronounced sedative and antihistaminic effects than earlier drugs. A year later, the French surgeon Pierre Huguenard used promethazine together with pethidine as part of a cocktail to induce relaxation and indifference in surgical patients. Another surgeon, Henri Laborit, believed the compound stabilized the central nervous system by causing "artificial hibernation" and described this state as "sedation without narcosis". He suggested to Rhône-Poulenc that they develop a compound with better-stabilizing properties. In December 1950, the chemist Paul Charpentier produced a series of compounds that included RP4560 or chlorpromazine.

Chlorpromazine was distributed for testing to physicians between April and August 1951. Laborit trialled the medicine at the Val-de-Grâce military hospital in Paris, using it as an anaesthetic booster in intravenous doses of 50 to 100 mg in surgery patients and confirming it as the best drug to date in calming and reducing shock, with patients reporting improved well being afterward. He also noted its hypothermic effect and suggested it may induce artificial hibernation. Laborit thought this would allow the body to better tolerate major surgery by reducing shock, a novel idea at the time.

Following on, Laborit considered whether chlorpromazine may have a role in managing patients with severe burns, Raynaud's phenomenon, or psychiatric disorders. At the Villejuif Mental Hospital in November 1951, he and Montassut administered an intravenous dose to psychiatrist Cornelia Quarti, who was acting as a volunteer. Quarti noted the indifference but fainted upon getting up to go to the toilet, and so further testing was discontinued. (Orthostatic hypotension is a known side effect of chlorpromazine). Despite this, Laborit continued to push for testing in psychiatric patients during early 1952. Psychiatrists were reluctant initially, but on 19 January 1952, it was administered (alongside pethidine, pentothal and ECT) to Jacques Lh., a 24-year-old manic patient, who responded dramatically; he was discharged after three weeks, having received 855 mg of the drug in total.

Pierre Deniker had heard about Laborit's work from his brother-in-law, who was a surgeon, and ordered chlorpromazine for a clinical trial at the Sainte-Anne Hospital Center in Paris where he was chief of the men's service. Together with the hospital director Jean Delay, they published their first clinical trial in 1952, in which they treated thirty-eight psychotic patients with daily injections of chlorpromazine without the use of other sedating agents. The response was dramatic; treatment with chlorpromazine went beyond simple sedation, with patients showing improvements in thinking and emotional behaviour. They also found that doses higher than those used by Laborit were required, giving patients 75–100 mg daily. Known colloquially as "Laborit's drug", chlorpromazine was released onto the market in 1953 by Rhône-Poulenc and given the trade name Largactil, derived from large "broad" and acti* "activity".

Deniker then visited America, where the publication of their work alerted the American psychiatric community that the new treatment might represent a real breakthrough. Heinz Lehmann of the Verdun Protestant Hospital in Montreal trialled it in seventy patients and also noted its striking effects, with patients' symptoms resolving after many years of unrelenting psychosis. By 1954, chlorpromazine was being used in the United States to treat schizophrenia, mania, psychomotor excitement, and other psychotic disorders. Rhône-Poulenc licensed chlorpromazine to Smith Kline & French (today's GlaxoSmithKline) in 1953. In 1955 it was approved in the United States for the treatment of emesis (vomiting). The effect of this drug in emptying psychiatric hospitals has been compared to that of penicillin on infectious diseases.

The popularity of the drug fell in the late 1960s as newer drugs came on the scene. From chlorpromazine several other similar antipsychotics were developed, leading to the discovery of antidepressants.

Chlorpromazine largely replaced electroconvulsive therapy, hydrotherapy, psychosurgery, and insulin shock therapy. By 1964, about fifty million people worldwide had taken it. Chlorpromazine, in widespread use for fifty years, remains a "benchmark" drug in the treatment of schizophrenia, an effective drug although not a perfect one.

== Society and culture ==
=== In literature ===
Thorazine was often depicted in Tom Wolfe's The Electric Kool-Aid Acid Test to abort bad trips on LSD. Thorazine is also mentioned in Fear and Loathing in Las Vegas, where it was reported to negate the effects of LSD: "You better hope there's some Thorazine in that bag, because if there's not, you're in bad trouble."

=== Names ===
Brand names include Thorazine, Largactil, Hibernal, and Megaphen (sold by Bayer in West-Germany since July 1953).

== Research ==
Chlorpromazine has tentative benefit in animals infected with Naegleria fowleri and shows antifungal and antibacterial activity in vitro. Like other phenothiazine derivatives such as perphenazine, trifluoperazine, and triflupromazine, it inhibits tubulin polymerization.

== Veterinary use ==
The veterinary use of chlorpromazine has generally been superseded by the use of acepromazine.

Chlorpromazine may be used as an antiemetic in dogs and cats, or, less often, as a sedative before anesthesia. In horses, it often causes ataxia and lethargy and is therefore seldom used.

It is commonly used to decrease nausea in animals that are too young for other common antiemetics. It is sometimes used as a preanesthetic and muscle relaxant in cattle, swine, sheep, and goats.

The use of chlorpromazine in food-producing animals is not permitted in the European Union, as a maximum residue limit could not be determined following assessment by the European Medicines Agency.
