= Dirty drug =

Informal term for a drug that binds to many different molecular targets or receptors

In pharmacology, a dirty drug is an informal term for drugs that may bind to many different molecular targets or receptors in the body, and so tend to have a wide range of effects and possibly adverse drug reactions. Today, pharmaceutical companies try to make new drugs as selective as possible to minimise binding to antitargets and hence reduce the occurrence of side effects and risk of adverse reactions.

Examples of compounds often cited as "dirty drugs" include tramadol, chlorpromazine, olanzapine, dextromethorphan, ibogaine, and ethanol, all of which bind to multiple receptors or influence multiple receptor systems. There may be instances of advantages to drugs that exhibit multi-receptor activity such as the anti-addictive drug ibogaine that acts within a broad range of neurohormonal systems where activity is also exhibited by drugs commonly associated with addiction including opioids, nicotine, and alcohol. Similarly chlorpromazine is primarily used as an antipsychotic, but its strong serotonin receptor blocking effects make it useful for treating serotonergic crisis such as serotonin syndrome. Dextromethorphan for its part is widely used as a cough medication, but its other actions have led to trials for several conditions such as its use as an adjunct to analgesia, and a potential anti-addictive drug, as well as its occasional recreational use as a dissociative.

Kanamycin is an aminoglycoside antibiotic which induces deafness through blockage of the outer hair cells of the cochlea; yet it has many other effects, weakening for instance the collagen and DNA biosynthesis. It acts by inhibiting the synthesis of proteins in susceptible organisms. Kanamycin requires close clinical supervision because of its potential toxicity and adverse side effects to the auditory and vestibular branches of the eighth cranial nerve and to the renal tubules.

Clozapine and latrepirdine are examples of drugs used in the treatment of CNS disorders that have a superior efficacy precisely because of their "multifarious" broadspectrum mode of activity. Likewise, in cancer chemotherapeutics, it has been recognized that drugs active at more than one target have a higher probability of being efficacious.

The anti-histamine and anti-cholinergic effects of atypical and low potency typical antipsychotics, such as the aforementioned clozapine and chlorpromazine, can also mediate against potentially distressing movement disorders such as extrapyramidal symptoms and akathisia associated with dopamine antagonism. In fact, clozapine may even help treat movement problems associated with Parkinson's disease.

Examples of "promiscuous" cancer drugs include: sunitinib, sorafenib, vandetanib, and axitinib.

In the field of drugs used to treat depression, the nonselective MAOIs and the TCAs are sometimes believed to have an efficacy that is superior to the SSRIs. SSRIs are usually nevertheless picked as the first-line choice of agent and not the (less-selective) MAOIs and TCAs for several reasons. Firstly, SSRIs are safer in overdose than TCAs. Secondly, MAOIs can cause serious side effects when mixed with certain foods, including life-threatening hypertensive crisis. MAOIs and TCAs generally have more side effects than SSRIs. TCAs in particular have anticholinergic side effects such as constipation and blurred vision, whereas SSRIs have fewer anticholinergic side effects.
