= Hans-Joachim Preuss =

German agricultural economist

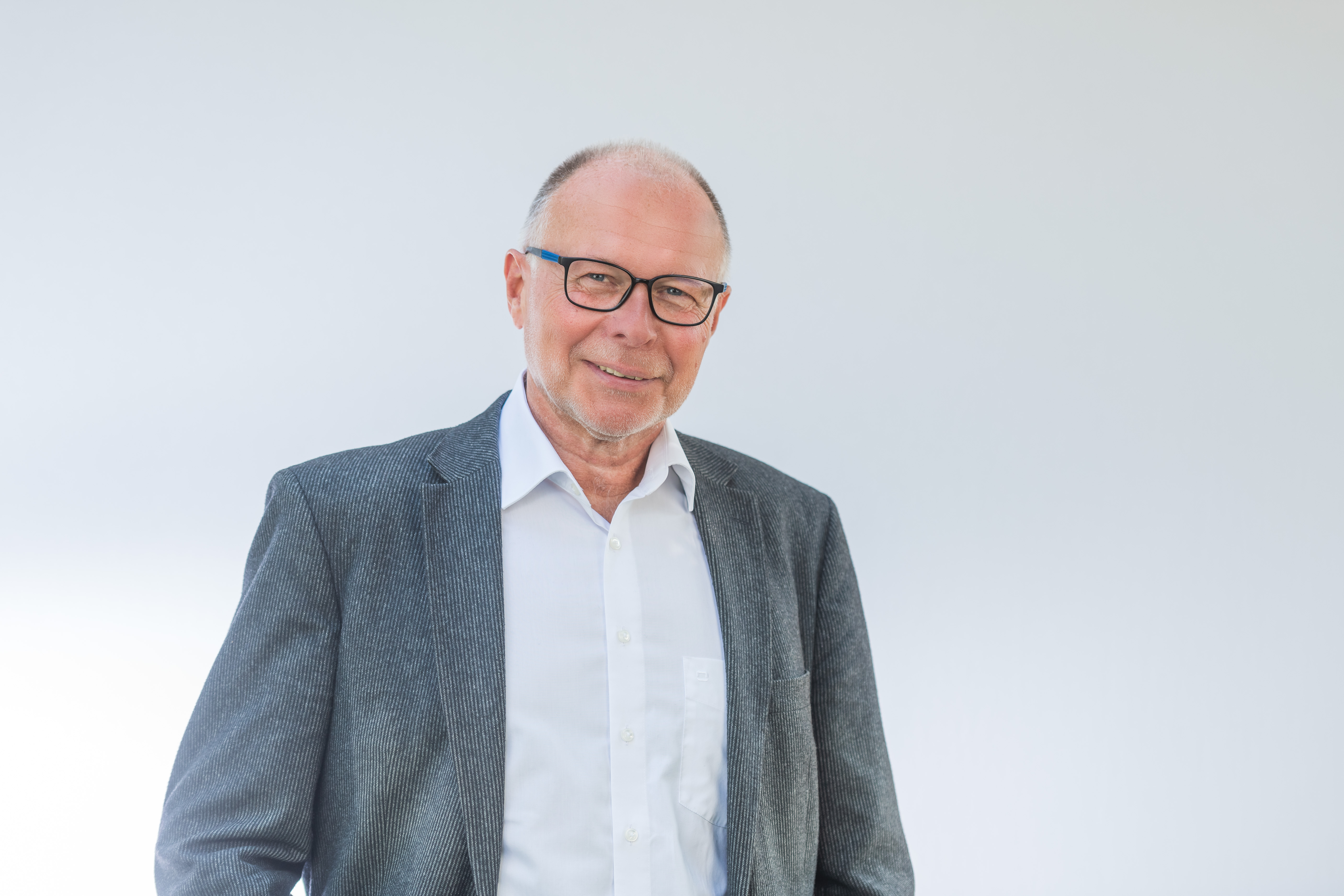
- Hans-Joachim Preuss, 2022
- Born: 5 June 1955 (age 71); Neuwied

Academic background
- Education: Gießen University

Academic work
- Discipline: Development Economics; Development studies; area studies; Agricultural Economics
- Institutions: University of Bonn

Hans-Joachim Preuss (born June 5, 1955, in Neuwied am Rhein) is a German agricultural economist.

== Profession and career ==
After graduating from high school, Preuss first completed a commercial apprenticeship before earning his general university entrance qualification at the Koblenz State College in Koblenz.

After a social pedagogical internship at the youth department of the Evangelical Church in the Rhineland in Kastellaun (Hunsrück) and an agricultural internship in Kirchberg (Hunsrück), he began studying agricultural sciences at the University of Giessen, which he graduated with as a graduate agricultural engineer. He then began postgraduate studies at the German Development Institute (DIE), Bonn. In 1986, Preuss began his professional activity in development cooperation at the GTZ as a project assistant in Mauritania and continued as a project economist and team leader in Benin. From 1991 to 1994 he was a research associate at the Center for Regional Development Research at the University of Giessen, where he received his doctorate with a case study on target group-oriented agricultural research in developing countries. After returning to GTZ in 1994, he was a member of the corporate development department until 1996.

In 1996, Preuss moved to Welthungerhilfe in Bonn, where he initially worked as head of the “Programs and Projects” department. From 2003 to 2009 he was Secretary General of Welthungerhilfe and headed the organization as managing director. On July 1, 2009, Hans-Joachim Preuss became managing director of GIZ and has been a member of the five-strong executive board since 2011. From 2018 to 2021, H.J. Preuss was country representative of the Friedrich Ebert Foundation in Cotonou, Benin.

Since 2014, Preuss has been a lecturer at the Institute for Political Science and Sociology of the University of Bonn. He teaches in particular on German and European development and security policy issues with African, Caribbean and Pacific island states. He has many years of professional experience at various levels in various governmental, non-governmental and academic development cooperation organizations in Germany and abroad. He was primarily concerned with development and security problems in Africa, with global migration movements and the future of international cooperation and documented these considerations in numerous publications.

Preuss has been a member of the SPD for many years and has been a member of the local association in Troisdorf since 1996. He is also chairman of the board of directors of the Berlin Governance Platform GmbH, Member of the board of the Andheri-Hilfe e.V. Bonn and chairman of the guest-and conference house Hunsrück e.V.

== Publications (selection) ==
- ... Klimawandel und globale Wanderungsbewegungen, in: Beck, Ralf-Uwe, Klaus Töpfer und Angelika Zahrnt (eds.), „Flucht – Ursachen bekämpfen, Flüchtlinge schützen. Plädoyer für eine humane Politik“, pp.. 39–44, Munich 2022: Oekom Verlag
- ... 20 Jahre Afghanistan: Lehren für das deutsche Engagement in Krisenregionen. de:Zeitschrift für Außen- und Sicherheitspolitik, vol. 15, pp. 1–21 (2022).
- ... Der schleichende Niedergang der Demokratie in Benin. Konsequenzen für die Förderung von Rechtsstaatlichkeit und gutem Regieren in der internationalen Zusammenarbeit mit Westafrika. Zeitschrift für Außen- und Sicherheitspolitik, vol. 13 (4); pp. 343–356 (2019)
- .... Forced Displacement and Migration – Approaches and Programmes of International Cooperation, Wiesbaden 2022: Springer (edited with: Christoph Beier und Dirk Messner)
- ... Potenziale und Grenzen der Zusammenarbeit von staatlichen und nichtstaatlichen Organisationen in Entwicklungspolitik und internationaler Zusammenarbeit. In: Heuser, M., Abdelalem, T. (eds) Strategisches Management humanitärer NGOs. Springer Gabler, Berlin, Heidelberg. (2018)
- ... Fragile Staatlichkeit in Afrika. Was kann Entwicklungszusammenarbeit leisten? . de:Zeitschrift für Außen- und Sicherheitspolitik, vol 6, pp. 309–318 (2013)
- ... Problems and Prospects of Agricultural Development in Cuba, Quarterly Journal of International Agriculture (2001), No. 2 (with: H. Gaese).
- ... Paysans, vulgarisateurs et chercheurs au sud du Bénin: Le trio déconnecté, Studien zur ländlichen Entwicklung, vol. 54, Münster, Hamburg, 1996 (with: A. Floquet and N. von der Lühe)
- ... Ländliche Entwicklung und regionales Ressourcenmanagement – Einführung und Überblick, in: Preuss, H.-J. A.; Roos, G. (eds.), „Ländliche Entwicklung und regionales Ressourcenmanagement: Konzepte – Instrumente – Erfahrungen“, Gießen, 1994 (with: G. Roos)
- ... Vom Camarade zum Monsieur. Sozioökonomische Probleme der Strukturanpassung in Benin. de:Peripherie (Zeitschrift), vol. 46 (1992), pp. 47–70 (with: D. Kohnert).
- ... Perspektiven Zielorientierter Projektplanung in der Entwicklungszusammenarbeit (= Ifo-Studien zur Entwicklungsforschung, vol. 22), London 1992 (with: D. Kohnert und P. Sauer).
