= Hermann Friedrich Gmeiner =

Hermann Friedrich Gmeiner (1870–1918) was a physician and first Professor for veterinary internal medicine at the Veterinary Faculty at the University of Giessen (1901–1918). He was succeeded by Friedrich Wilhelm Zwick (1871–1941).

== Publications ==
- "Demodex folliculorum des Menschen und der Tiere" - Friedrich Gmeiner (W. Braumüller, 1908)
- "Demodex folliculorum des Menschen und der Tiere" - Friedrich Gmeiner - Full text

== Bibliography ==
- "Hermann Friedrich Gmeiner (1870–1918) : erster Fachvertreter für innere Veterinärmedizin an der Universität Giessen (1901–1918)" - Gerhard Gilla (JustusLiebig- Universität, 1990)
