= Georg Haas (physician) =

German medical doctor

- Born: 4 April 1886; Nuremberg, Germany
- Died: 6 December 1971 (aged 85)
- Occupation: Medical doctor
- Known for: Hemodialysis

Georg Haas (4 April 1886 – 6 December 1971) was a German medical doctor was born in Nuremberg, Germany. Haas performed the first human hemodialysis treatment. Haas studied medicine at the Universities of Munich and Freiburg. He wrote his doctoral thesis while attending the institute of the famous pathologist Ludwig Aschoff.

== Scientific work ==
Haas performed the first human hemodialysis in the history of medicine in 1924 in the town of Giessen, Germany. The procedure lasted only 15 minutes, and hirudin served as the anticoagulant. Haas was able to develop a dialyzer consisting of U-shaped collodion tubes immersed in a dialysate bath placed in a glass cylinder. He performed several hemodialysis procedures in uremics between 1924 and 1928, and reported for the first time the clinical results obtained. In 1928, Haas introduced heparin into the dialysis procedure. Because of lack of support by the medical community, Haas was forced to discontinue his promising work.

== Quotes ==
"From the initial idea to the actual realization of the dialysis method, it was a very long way. I would have to say, it was the way of the Cross...." (1928)
