= Preanesthetic agent =

Drug used to ease or aid anaesthesia

A preanesthetic agent (or preanaesthetic agent) is a drug that is given before the administration of an anesthetic to make anesthesia more pleasant and safe.

== Examples ==
Examples of preanesthetic agents are:

- Acepromazine
- atropine
- diazepam
- Scopolamine
- Opioid analgesics, such as morphine, pethidine and buprenorphine.

These drugs are used before the administration of an anesthetic to improve patient comfort, reduce possible side effects such as Postanesthetic shivering, relieve pain, and increase the effectiveness of the anesthetic.

== See also ==
- Premedication
